= Diethylenetriamine =

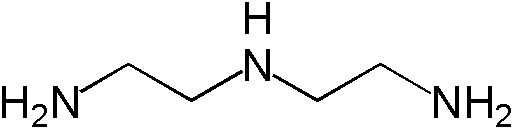
- Skeletal formula of diethylenetriamine

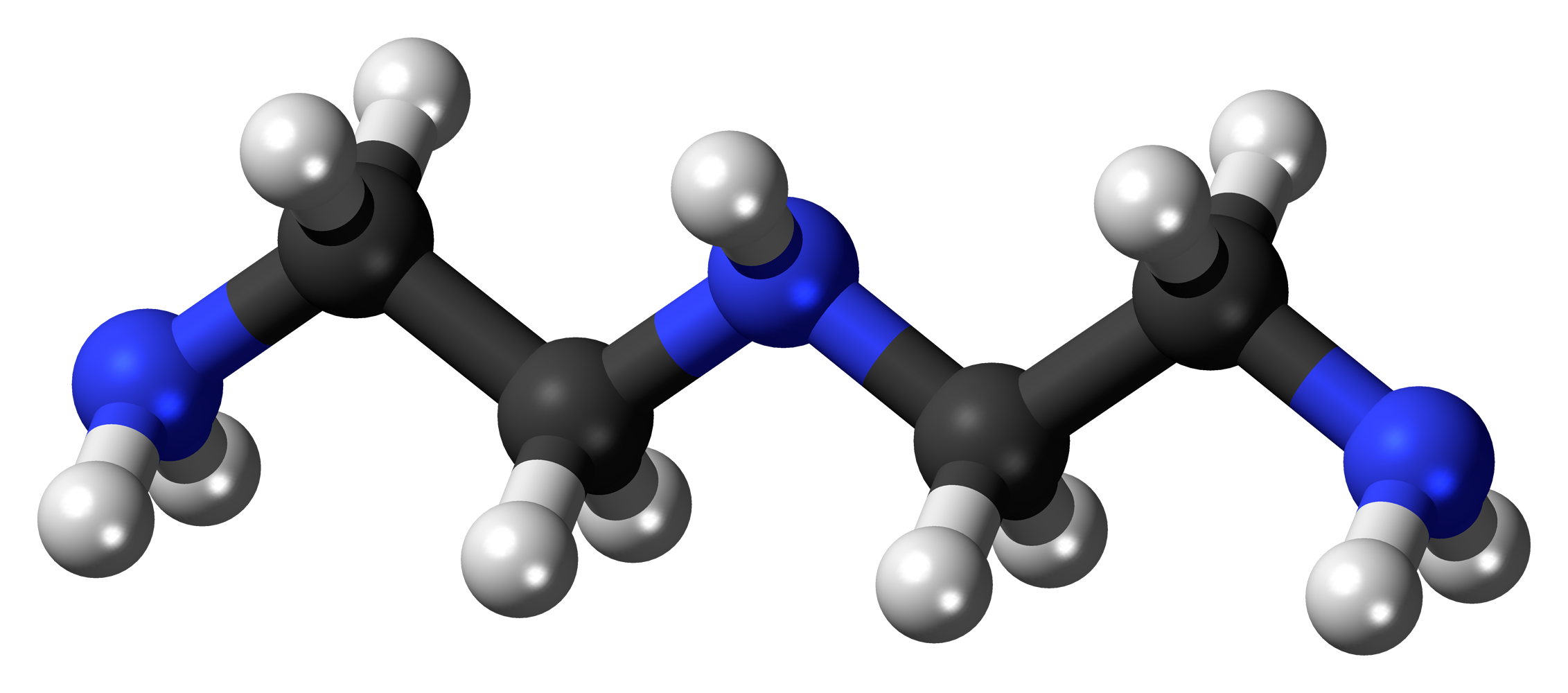
- Ball and stick model of diethylenetriamine

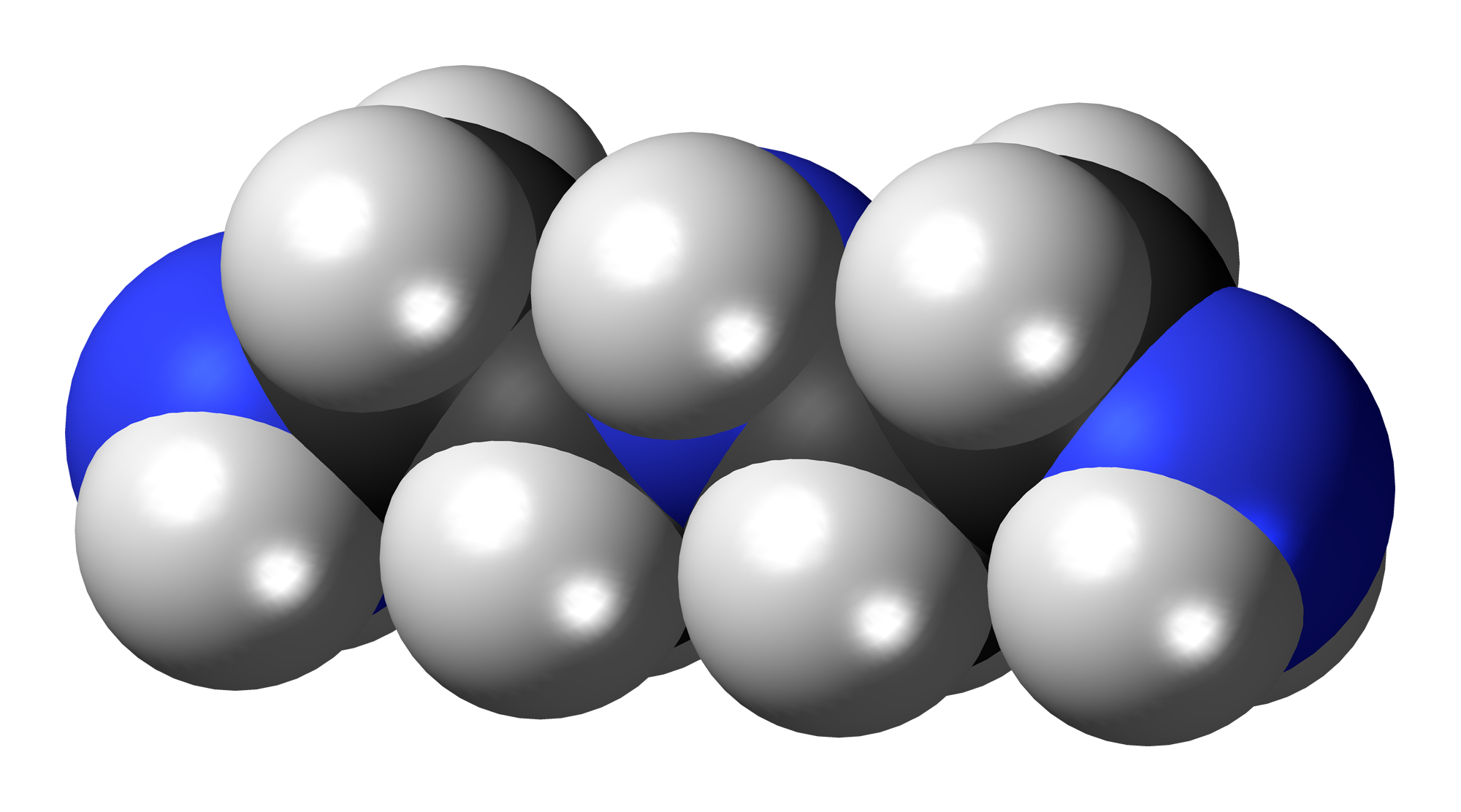
- Spacefill model of diethylenetriamine

Names
- Preferred IUPAC name N^{1}-(2-Aminoethyl)ethane-1,2-diamine
- Other names N-(2-Aminoethyl)-1,2-ethanediamine; bis(2-Aminoethyl)amine; DETA; 2,2'-Diaminodiethylamine

Identifiers
CAS Number	111-40-0
3D model (JSmol)	Interactive image
Beilstein Reference	605314
ChEBI	CHEBI:30629
ChEMBL	ChEMBL303429
ChemSpider	13835401
ECHA InfoCard	100.003.515
EC Number	203-865-4
Gmelin Reference	2392
MeSH	diethylenetriamine
PubChem CID	8111
RTECS number	IE1225000
UNII	03K6SX4V2J
UN number	2079
CompTox Dashboard (EPA)	DTXSID2025050
- InChI: InChI=1S/C4H13N3/c5-1-3-7-4-2-6/h7H,1-6H2 Key: RPNUMPOLZDHAAY-UHFFFAOYSA-N
- SMILES: NCCNCCN

Properties
Chemical formula	C_{4}H_{13}N_{3}
Molar mass	103.169 g·mol^{−1}
Appearance	Colourless liquid
Odor	Ammoniacal
Density	955 mg mL^{−1}; 951 mg mL^{−1}(20°C); 942.3 mg mL^{−1}(30°C); 933.8 mg mL^{−1}(40°C); 917 mg mL^{−1}(60°C); 891.9 mg mL^{−1}(90°C)
Melting point	−39.00 °C; −38.20 °F; 234.15 K
Boiling point	204.1 °C; 399.3 °F; 477.2 K
Solubility in water	miscible
log P	−1.73
Vapor pressure	10 Pa (at 20 °C)
Refractive index (n_{D})	1.484

Thermochemistry
Heat capacity (C)	254 J K^{−1} mol^{−1} (at 40 °C)
Std enthalpy of formation (Δ_{f}H^{⦵}_{298})	−65.7–−64.7 kJ mol^{−1}
Std enthalpy of combustion (Δ_{c}H^{⦵}_{298})	−3367.2–−3366.2 kJ mol^{−1}

Hazards
- GHS labelling
Pictograms	(GHS05: Corrosive) (GHS07: Exclamation mark)
Signal word	Danger
Hazard statements	H302, H312, H314, H317
Precautionary statements	P280, P305+P351+P338, P310
Flash point	102 °C (216 °F; 375 K)
Autoignition temperature	358 °C (676 °F; 631 K)
Explosive limits	2–6.7%
- NIOSH (US health exposure limits)
PEL (Permissible)	none
REL (Recommended)	TWA 1 ppm (4 mg/m^{3})
IDLH (Immediate danger)	N.D.

Related compounds
Related amines	Dimethylamine; Trimethylamine; N-Nitrosodimethylamine; Diethylamine; Triethylamine; Diisopropylamine; Dimethylaminopropylamine; N,N-Diisopropylethylamine; Triisopropylamine; Tris(2-aminoethyl)amine; Mechlorethamine; HN1 (nitrogen mustard); HN3 (nitrogen mustard)
Related compounds	Unsymmetrical dimethylhydrazine; Biguanide; Dithiobiuret; Agmatine
- Except where otherwise noted, data are given for materials in their standard state (at 25 °C [77 °F], 100 kPa). verify (what is ?) Infobox references

Diethylenetriamine (abbreviated dien or DETA) and also known as 2,2’-Iminodi(ethylamine)) is an organic compound with the formula HN(CH_{2}CH_{2}NH_{2})_{2}. This colourless hygroscopic liquid is soluble in water and polar organic solvents, but not simple hydrocarbons. Diethylenetriamine is structural analogue of diethylene glycol. Its chemical properties resemble those for ethylene diamine, and it has similar uses. It is a weak base and its aqueous solution is alkaline. DETA is a byproduct of the production of ethylenediamine from ethylene dichloride.

== Reactions and uses ==
Diethylenetriamine is a common curing agent for epoxy resins in epoxy adhesives and other thermosets. It is N-alkylated upon reaction with epoxide groups forming crosslinks.

Idealized structure of a triamine-cured epoxy glue. The resin's epoxide groups have all reacted with the N-H groups of the triamine hardener. The resulting highly crosslinked material contains many OH groups, which confer adhesive properties.

In coordination chemistry, it serves as a tridentate ligand forming complexes such as Co(dien)(NO_{2})_{3}. It also serves as the backbone of pentetic acid, which allows even higher denticity.

Like some related amines, it is used in oil industry for the extraction of acid gas.

Like ethylenediamine, DETA can also be used to sensitize nitromethane, making a liquid explosive compound similar to PLX. This compound is cap sensitive with an explosive velocity of around 6200 m/s and is discussed in patent #3,713,915. Mixed with unsymmetrical dimethylhydrazine it was used as Hydyne, a propellent for liquid-fuel rockets.

DETA has been evaluated for use in the Countermine System under development by the U.S. Office of Naval Research, where it would be used to ignite and consume the explosive fill of land mines in beach and surf zones.

== See also ==
- Triethylenetetramine
