= Dimethylaminopropylamine =

- Skeletal formula of dimethylaminopropylamine

Names
- Preferred IUPAC name N^{1},N^{1}-Dimethylpropane-1,3-diamine
- Other names: 3-(Dimethylamino)-1-propylamine; 3-Dimethylaminopropylamine; N,N-Dimethyl-1,3-propanediamine

Identifiers
CAS Number	109-55-7
3D model (JSmol)	Interactive image
ChEMBL	ChEMBL1232234
ChemSpider	7703
ECHA InfoCard	100.003.347
EC Number	203-680-9
MeSH	3-dimethylaminopropylamine
PubChem CID	7993
RTECS number	TX7525000
UNII	I98I2UEC03
UN number	2733
CompTox Dashboard (EPA)	DTXSID5025102
- InChI: InChI=1S/C5H14N2/c1-7(2)5-3-4-6/h3-6H2,1-2H3 Key: IUNMPGNGSSIWFP-UHFFFAOYSA-N
- SMILES: CN(C)CCCN

Properties
Chemical formula	C_{5}H_{14}N_{2}
Molar mass	102.181 g·mol^{−1}
Appearance	Colourless liquid
Odor	fishy, ammoniacal
Density	812 mg mL^{−1}
Boiling point	132.1 °C; 269.7 °F; 405.2 K
log P	−0.211
Vapor pressure	0.7–2.4 kPa
Refractive index (n_{D})	1.435–1.436

Thermochemistry
Heat capacity (C)	255.7 J K^{−1} mol^{−1}
Std molar entropy (S^{⦵}_{298})	323.0 J K^{−1} mol^{−1}
Std enthalpy of formation (Δ_{f}H^{⦵}_{298})	−76.9–−76.9 kJ mol^{−1}
Std enthalpy of combustion (Δ_{c}H^{⦵}_{298})	−3.8955–−3.8875 MJ mol^{−1}

Hazards
- GHS labelling
Pictograms	(GHS02: Flammable) (GHS05: Corrosive) (GHS07: Exclamation mark)
Signal word	Danger
Hazard statements	H226, H302, H314, H317
Precautionary statements	P280, P305+P351+P338, P310
Flash point	32 °C (90 °F; 305 K)
Explosive limits	2.3–12.36%
- Lethal dose or concentration (LD, LC)
LD_{50} (median dose)	487 mg kg^{−1} (dermal, rabbit); 1.87 g kg^{−1} (oral, rat)

Related compounds
Related amines	Dimethylamine; Trimethylamine; N-Nitrosodimethylamine; Diethylamine; Triethylamine; Diisopropylamine; Diethylenetriamine; N,N-Diisopropylethylamine; Triisopropylamine; Tris(2-aminoethyl)amine; Mechlorethamine; HN1 (nitrogen mustard); HN3 (nitrogen mustard)
Related compounds	Unsymmetrical dimethylhydrazine; Biguanide; Dithiobiuret; Agmatine
- Except where otherwise noted, data are given for materials in their standard state (at 25 °C [77 °F], 100 kPa). verify (what is ?) Infobox references

Dimethylaminopropylamine (DMAPA) is a diamine used in the preparation of some surfactants, such as cocamidopropyl betaine which is an ingredient in many personal care products including soaps, shampoos, and cosmetics. BASF, a major producer, claims that DMAPA-derivatives do not sting the eyes and makes a fine-bubble foam, making it appropriate in shampoos.

== Preparation and reactions ==
DMAPA is commonly produced commercially via the reaction between dimethylamine and acrylonitrile (a Michael reaction) to produce dimethylaminopropionitrile. A subsequent hydrogenation step yields DMAPA:

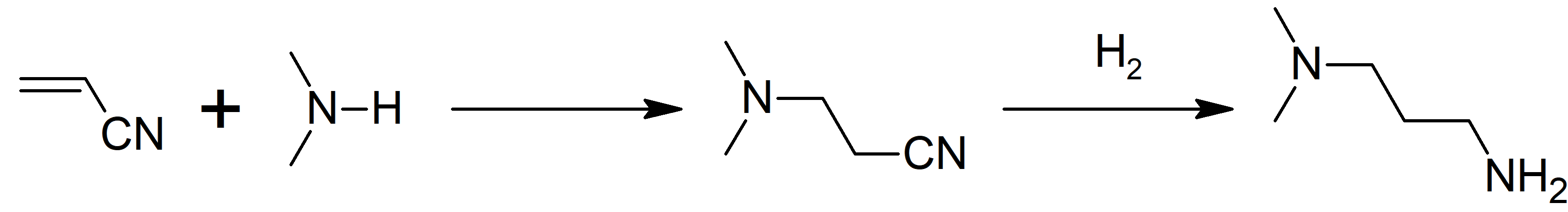

DMAPA is readily converted to the mustard dimethylaminopropyl-3-chloride, a powerful alkylating agent.

== Health effects ==
Dimethylaminopropylamine is a known skin irritant and its presence as an impurity in cocamidopropyl betaine is thought to be the cause of irritation experienced by some individuals.

== See also ==
- 1,1-Dimethylethylenediamine
- 1,2-Dimethylethylenediamine
