= Tris(2-aminoethyl)amine =

- Skeletal formula of tris(2-aminoethyl)amino

Names
- Preferred IUPAC name N^{1},N^{1}-Bis(2-aminoethyl)ethane-1,2-diamine
- Other names: 2,2′,2′′-Nitrilotri(ethan-1-amine); 2,2′,2′′-Nitrilotriethylamine; 2,2′,2′′-Triaminotriethylamine; TAEA

Identifiers
CAS Number	4097-89-6; 14350-52-8 (3 HCl)
3D model (JSmol)	Interactive image
Beilstein Reference	1739626
ChEBI	CHEBI:30631
ChEMBL	ChEMBL19823
ChemSpider	70131
ECHA InfoCard	100.021.689
EC Number	223-857-4
Gmelin Reference	27074
MeSH	Tris(2-aminoethyl)amine
PubChem CID	77731
RTECS number	KH8587082
UNII	3GY3QSG6H5
UN number	2922
CompTox Dashboard (EPA)	DTXSID4063296
- InChI: InChI=1S/C6H18N4/c7-1-4-10(5-2-8)6-3-9/h1-9H2 Key: MBYLVOKEDDQJDY-UHFFFAOYSA-N
- SMILES: NCCN(CCN)CCN

Properties
Chemical formula	C_{6}H_{18}N_{4}
Molar mass	146.238 g·mol^{−1}
Appearance	Colorless liquid
Odor	Fishy, ammoniacal
Density	0.976 g/mL (20 °C)
Melting point	−16 °C (3 °F; 257 K)
Boiling point	265 °C (509 °F; 538 K)
Solubility in water	Miscible
log P	−2.664
Vapor pressure	3 Pa (at 20 °C)
Refractive index (n_{D})	1.497

Thermochemistry
Std enthalpy of formation (Δ_{f}H^{⦵}_{298})	−74.3 to −72.9 kJ mol^{−1}
Std enthalpy of combustion (Δ_{c}H^{⦵}_{298})	−4860.6 to −4859.2 kJ mol^{−1}

Hazards
- GHS labelling
Pictograms	(GHS05: Corrosive) (GHS06: Toxic)
Signal word	Danger
Hazard statements	H301, H310, H314
Precautionary statements	P280, P302+P350, P305+P351+P338, P310
Flash point	113 °C (235 °F; 386 K)
- Lethal dose or concentration (LD, LC)
LD_{50} (median dose)	117 mg kg^{−1} (dermal, rabbit); 246 mg kg^{−1} (oral, rat)
Safety data sheet (SDS)	fishersci.com

Related compounds
Related amines	Dimethylamine; Trimethylamine; N-Nitrosodimethylamine; Diethylamine; Triethylamine; Diisopropylamine; Dimethylaminopropylamine; Diethylenetriamine; N,N-Diisopropylethylamine; Triisopropylamine; Mechlorethamine; HN1 (nitrogen mustard); HN3 (nitrogen mustard)
Related compounds	Unsymmetrical dimethylhydrazine; Biguanide; Dithiobiuret; Agmatine
- Except where otherwise noted, data are given for materials in their standard state (at 25 °C [77 °F], 100 kPa). verify (what is ?) Infobox references

Tris(2-aminoethyl)amine is the organic compound with the formula N(CH_{2}CH_{2}NH_{2})_{3}. This colourless liquid is soluble in water and is highly basic, consisting of a tertiary amine center and three pendant primary amine groups. Tris(2-aminoethyl)amine is commonly abbreviated as tren or TREN. It is used a crosslinking agent in the synthesis of polyimine networks and a tripodal ligand in coordination chemistry.

== Supramolecular and polymer derivatives ==
Tris(2-aminoethyl)amine has been used to prepare molecular capsules and related supramolecular structures.

== Metal complexes ==
Tren is a C_{3}-symmetric, tetradentate chelating ligand that forms stable complexes with transition metals, especially those in the +2 and +3 oxidation states. Tren complexes exist with relatively few isomers, reflecting the constrained connectivity of this tetramine. Thus, only a single achiral stereoisomer exists for [Co(tren)X_{2}]^{+}, where X is a halide or pseudohalide. In contrast, for [Co(trien)X_{2}]^{+} five diastereomers are possible, four of which are chiral. In a few cases, tren serves as a tridentate ligand with one of the primary amine groups non-coordinated. Tren is a common impurity in the more common triethylenetetramine ("trien"). As a trifunctional amine, tren forms a triisocyanate when derivatized with COCl_{2}.

Tren is known to react fast in the presence of (aromatic) aldehydes to form an imine. During this process, water is formed, making it a condensation reaction. Due to this fast and efficient reaction, tren is commonly used in the preparation of polyimines.

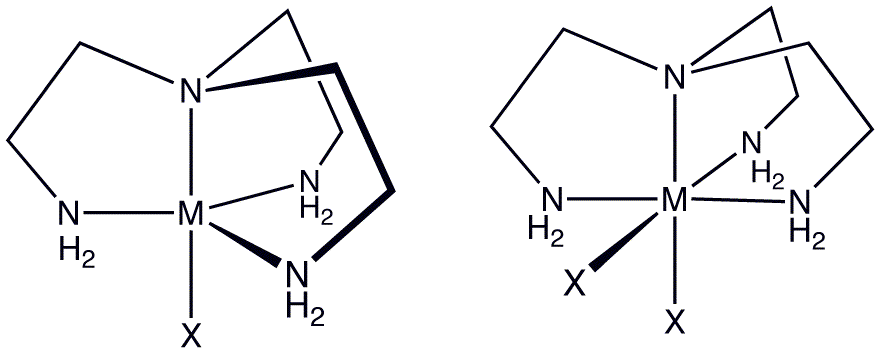
Structures of trigonal bipyramidal and octahedral complexes of the formulae M(tren)X (left, C_{3v} symmetry) and M(tren)X_{2} (right, C_{s} symmetry).

=== N-Methylated derivatives ===
The permethylated derivative of tren has the formula N(CH_{2}CH_{2}NMe_{2})_{3}. "Me_{6}tren" forms a variety of complexes but, unlike tren, does not stabilize Co(III). Related amino-triphosphines are also well developed, such as N(CH_{2}CH_{2}PPh_{2})_{3} (melting point 101–102 °C). This species is prepared from the nitrogen mustard N(CH_{2}CH_{2}Cl)_{3}.

N,N,N-Trimethyltren, N(CH_{2}CH_{2}NHMe)_{3} is also available.

=== Other derivatives ===
Trimethylsilyltren, N(CH_{2}CH_{2}N(Si(CH_{3})_{3})_{3}, is also available.

== Safety considerations ==
(H_{2}NCH_{2}CH_{2})_{3}N, like other polyamines, is corrosive. It causes severe skin burns and eye damage, is harmful if inhaled due to the destruction of respiratory tissues, is toxic if swallowed, and can be fatal in contact with skin. Its median lethal dose is 246 mg/kg, oral (rat), and 117 mg/kg, dermal (rabbit). It is also combustible.
