= Trimethylamine =

Chemical compound responsible for rotten fish odor

- Skeletal formula of trimethylamine with all implicit hydrogens shown

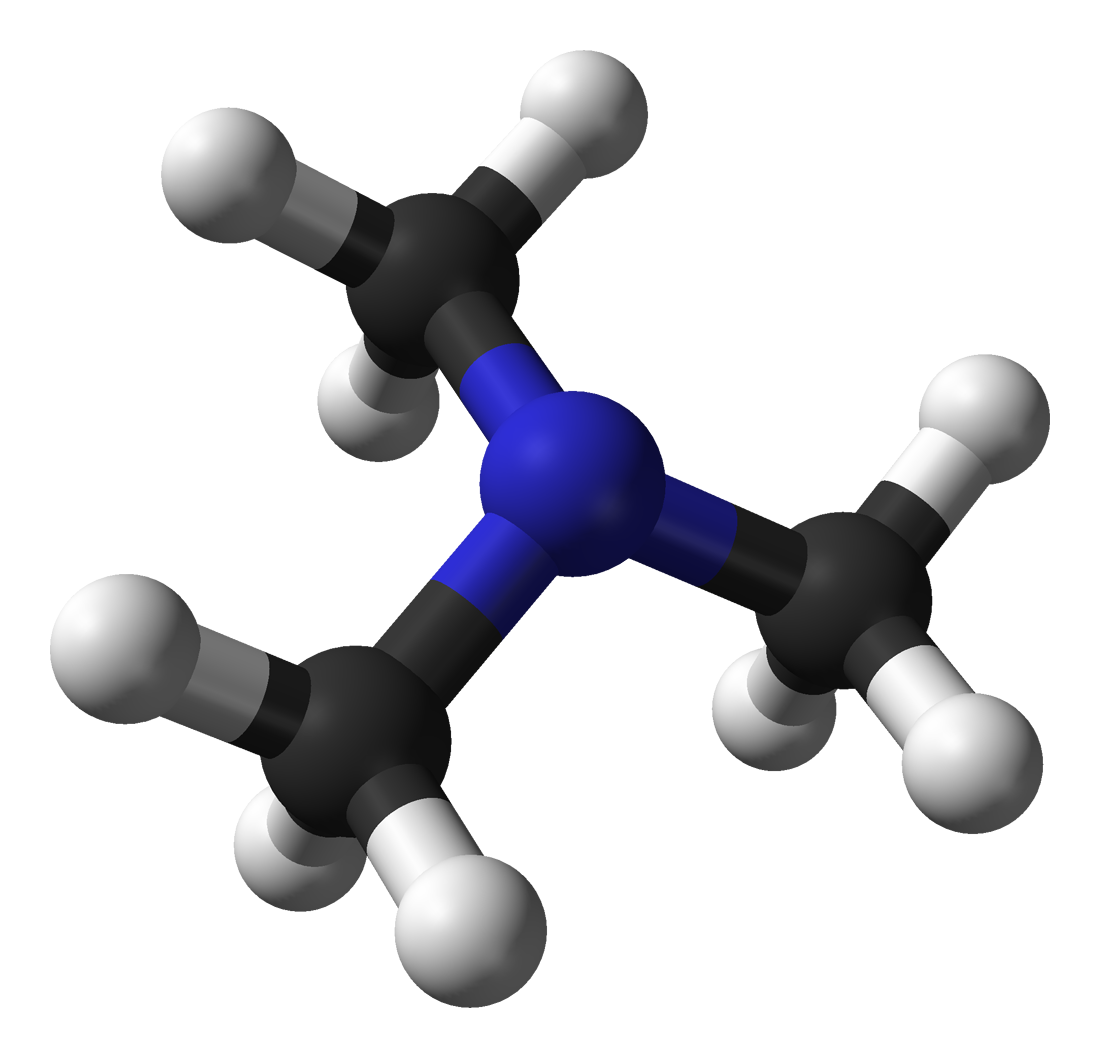
Ball and stick model of trimethylamine
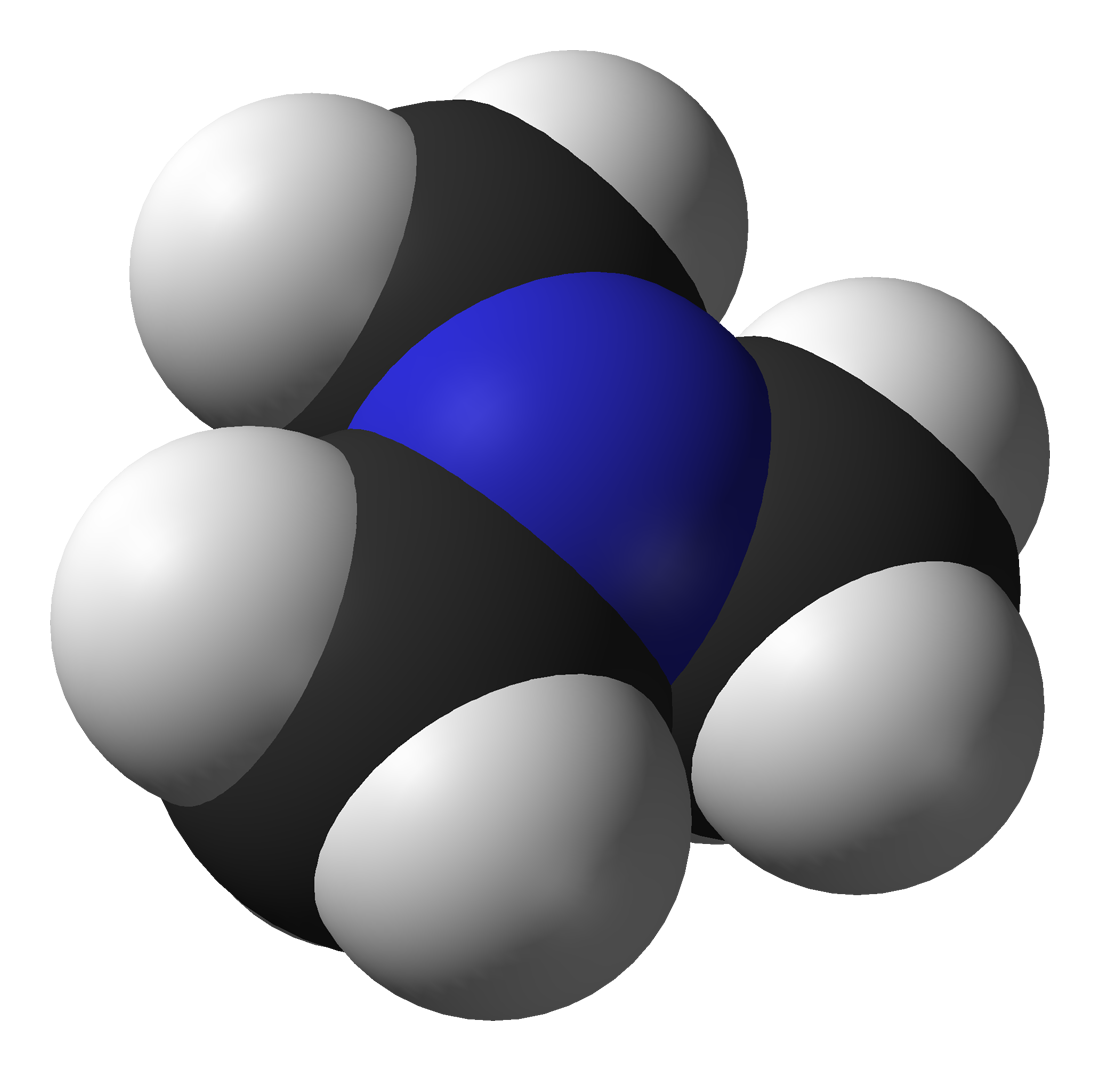
Spacefill model of trimethylamine

Names
- Preferred IUPAC name N,N-Dimethylmethanamine
- Other names (Trimethyl)amine (The name trimethylamine is deprecated.)

Identifiers
CAS Number	75-50-3
3D model (JSmol)	Interactive image
Abbreviations	TMA; Me_{3}N
Beilstein Reference	956566
ChEBI	CHEBI:18139
ChEMBL	ChEMBL439723
ChemSpider	1114
ECHA InfoCard	100.000.796
EC Number	200-875-0
KEGG	C00565
PubChem CID	1146
RTECS number	PA0350000
UNII	LHH7G8O305
UN number	1083
CompTox Dashboard (EPA)	DTXSID2026238
- InChI: InChI=1S/C3H9N/c1-4(2)3/h1-3H3 Key: GETQZCLCWQTVFV-UHFFFAOYSA-N
- SMILES: CN(C)C

Properties
Chemical formula	C_{3}H_{9}N
Molar mass	59.112 g·mol^{−1}
Appearance	Colorless gas
Odor	Fishy, ammoniacal
Density	670 kg m^{−3} (at 0 °C); 627.0 kg m^{−3} (at 25 °C)
Melting point	−117.20 °C; −178.96 °F; 155.95 K
Boiling point	3 to 7 °C; 37 to 44 °F; 276 to 280 K
Solubility in water	Miscible
log P	0.119
Vapor pressure	188.7 kPa (at 20 °C)
Henry's law constant (k_{H})	95 μmol Pa^{−1} kg^{−1}
Basicity (pK_{b})	4.19
Dipole moment	0.612 D

Thermochemistry
Std enthalpy of formation (Δ_{f}H^{⦵}_{298})	−24.5 to −23.0 kJ mol^{−1}

Hazards
- GHS labelling
Pictograms	(GHS02: Flammable) (GHS05: Corrosive) (GHS07: Exclamation mark)
Signal word	Danger
Hazard statements	H220, H315, H318, H332, H335
Precautionary statements	P210, P261, P280, P305+P351+P338
NFPA 704 (fire diamond)	2 4 0
Flash point	−7 °C (19 °F; 266 K)
Autoignition temperature	190 °C (374 °F; 463 K)
Explosive limits	2–11.6%
- Lethal dose or concentration (LD, LC)
LD_{50} (median dose)	500 mg kg^{−1} (oral, rat)
- NIOSH (US health exposure limits)
PEL (Permissible)	none
REL (Recommended)	TWA 10 ppm (24 mg/m^{3}) ST 15 ppm (36 mg/m^{3})
IDLH (Immediate danger)	N.D.

Related compounds
Related amines	Dimethylamine; N-Nitrosodimethylamine; Diethylamine; Triethylamine; Diisopropylamine; Dimethylaminopropylamine; Diethylenetriamine; N,N-Diisopropylethylamine; Triisopropylamine; Tris(2-aminoethyl)amine; Mechlorethamine; HN1 (nitrogen mustard); HN3 (nitrogen mustard)
Related compounds	Unsymmetrical dimethylhydrazine; Biguanide; Dithiobiuret; Trimethylphosphine; Trimethylarsine; Trimethylstibine; Trimethylbismuth
- Except where otherwise noted, data are given for materials in their standard state (at 25 °C [77 °F], 100 kPa). verify (what is ?) Infobox references

Trimethylamine (TMA) is an organic compound with the formula N(CH_{3})_{3}. It is a trimethylated derivative of ammonia. TMA is widely used in industry. At higher concentrations it has an ammonia-like odor, and can cause necrosis of mucous membranes on contact. At lower concentrations, it has a "fishy" odor, the odor associated with rotting fish.

== Physical and chemical properties ==
TMA is a colorless, hygroscopic, and flammable tertiary amine. It is a gas at room temperature but is usually sold as a 40% solution in water. It is also sold in pressurized gas cylinders.

TMA protonates to give the trimethylammonium cation. Trimethylamine is a good nucleophile, and this reactivity underpins most of its applications. Trimethylamine is a Lewis base that forms adducts with a variety of Lewis acids.

== Production ==
=== Industry and laboratory ===
Trimethylamine is prepared by the reaction of ammonia and methanol employing a catalyst:

3 CH_{3}OH + NH_{3} → (CH_{3})_{3}N + 3 H_{2}O

This reaction coproduces the other methylamines, dimethylamine (CH_{3})_{2}NH and methylamine CH_{3}NH_{2}.

Trimethylammonium chloride has been prepared by a reaction of ammonium chloride and paraformaldehyde:

9 (CH_{2}=O)_{n} + 2n NH_{4}Cl → 2n (CH_{3})_{3}N•HCl + 3n H_{2}O + 3n CO_{2}

=== Biosynthesis ===
Trimethylamine is produced by several routes in nature. Well studied are the degradation of choline and carnitine.

== Applications ==
Trimethylamine is used in the synthesis of choline, tetramethylammonium hydroxide, plant growth regulators, herbicides, strongly basic anion exchange resins, dye leveling agents and a number of basic dyes. Gas sensors to test for fish freshness detect trimethylamine.

== Toxicity ==
In humans, ingestion of certain plant and animal (e.g., red meat, egg yolk) food containing lecithin, choline, and L-carnitine provides certain gut microbiota with the substrate to synthesize TMA, which is then absorbed into the bloodstream. High levels of trimethylamine in the body are associated with the development of trimethylaminuria, or fish odor syndrome, caused by a genetic defect in the enzyme which degrades TMA or by taking large doses of supplements containing choline or L-carnitine. TMA is metabolized by the liver to trimethylamine N-oxide (TMAO); TMAO is being investigated as a possible proatherogenic substance which may accelerate atherosclerosis in those eating foods with a high content of TMA precursors. TMA also causes the odor of some human infections, bad breath, and bacterial vaginosis.

Trimethylamine is a full agonist of human TAAR5, a trace amine-associated receptor that is expressed in the olfactory epithelium and functions as an olfactory receptor for tertiary amines. One or more additional odorant receptors appear to be involved in trimethylamine olfaction in humans as well.

Acute and chronic toxic effects of TMA were suggested in medical literature as early as the 19th century. TMA causes eye and skin irritation, and it is suggested to be a uremic toxin. In patients, trimethylamine caused stomach ache, vomiting, diarrhoea, lacrimation, greying of the skin and agitation. Apart from that, reproductive/developmental toxicity has been reported. Some experimental studies suggested that TMA may be involved in etiology of cardiovascular diseases.

Guidelines with exposure limit for workers are available e.g. the Recommendation from the Scientific Committee on Occupational Exposure Limits by the European Union Commission.

=== Trimethylaminuria ===
Trimethylaminuria is an autosomal recessive genetic disorder involving a defect in the function or expression of flavin-containing monooxygenase 3 (FMO3) which results in poor trimethylamine metabolism. Individuals with trimethylaminuria develop a characteristic fish odor—the smell of trimethylamine—in their sweat, urine, and breath after the consumption of choline-rich foods. A condition similar to trimethylaminuria has also been observed in a certain breed of Rhode Island Red chicken that produces eggs with a fishy smell, especially after eating food containing a high proportion of rapeseed.

== In the history of psychoanalysis ==
The first dream of his own which Sigmund Freud tried to analyse in detail, when he was developing his theories about the interpretation of dreams, involved a patient of Freud's who had been given an injection of trimethylamine in the dream, with the chemical formula of the substance, written in bold letters on the bottle, jumping out at Freud.

== See also ==
- Ammonia, NH_{3}
- Ammonium, NH_{4}^{+}
- Methylamine, (CH_{3})NH_{2}
- Triethylamine (TEA)
