= TL-301 =

Names
- IUPAC name N,N-bis(2-chloroethyl)propan-2-amine

Identifiers
CAS Number	619-34-1
3D model (JSmol)	Interactive image
ChemSpider	30001
PubChem CID	32369
CompTox Dashboard (EPA)	DTXSID60210926
- InChI: InChI=1S/C7H15Cl2N/c1-7(2)10(5-3-8)6-4-9/h7H,3-6H2,1-2H3 Key: WAEDMQMDOHQPFL-UHFFFAOYSA-N
- SMILES: CC(C)N(CCCl)CCCl

Properties
Melting point	13.7 °C (56.7 °F; 286.8 K)
Boiling point	67–68 °C (153–154 °F; 340–341 K)

Hazards
- Lethal dose or concentration (LD, LC)
LD_{50} (median dose)	1.1 mg/kg (subcutaneous, mice)(hydrochloride salt); 1 mg/kg (subcutaneous, rats)(hydrochloride salt); 0.5 mg/kg (intravenous, rat)(hydrochloride salt); 22 mg/kg (oral, mice)(hydrochloride salt); 0.5 mg/kg (subcutaneous, mice)(hydrochloride salt); 2 mg/kg (subcutaneous, rats)(hydrochloride salt)
LD_{Lo} (lowest published)	25 mg/kg (oral, rats)(hydrochloride salt)
- Except where otherwise noted, data are given for materials in their standard state (at 25 °C [77 °F], 100 kPa). Infobox references

TL-301 is a type of nitrogen mustard.

== See also ==
- HN1 (nitrogen mustard)
- HN2 (nitrogen mustard)
- HN3 (nitrogen mustard)
