= KB-16 =

Names
- Preferred IUPAC name Methyl (2-chloroethyl)nitrosocarbamate
- Other names TL-186

Identifiers
CAS Number	13589-15-6
3D model (JSmol)	Interactive image
ChemSpider	24333
PubChem CID	26121
UNII	G43VQ2XGG3
CompTox Dashboard (EPA)	DTXSID60159588
- InChI: InChI=1S/C4H7ClN2O3/c1-10-4(8)7(6-9)3-2-5/h2-3H2,1H3 Key: ZIVWROYTZSSKDC-UHFFFAOYSA-N
- SMILES: COC(=O)N(CCCl)N=O

Properties
Chemical formula	C_{4}H_{7}ClN_{2}O_{3}
Molar mass	166.56 g·mol^{−1}

Hazards
- Lethal dose or concentration (LD, LC)
LD_{50} (median dose)	1.1 mg/kg (intravenous, rats); 20 mg/kg (oral, rats); 8 mg/kg (subcutaneous, rats)
- Except where otherwise noted, data are given for materials in their standard state (at 25 °C [77 °F], 100 kPa). Infobox references

KB-16 is a nitrosocarbamate vesicant. KB-16 is unique among vesicants as it causes long lasting corneal clouding.

== See also ==
- Lewisite
- Sulfur mustard
- HN1 (nitrogen mustard)
- HN2 (nitrogen mustard)
- HN3 (nitrogen mustard)
- Nitrosourea
- Streptozocin
