= Triisopropylamine =

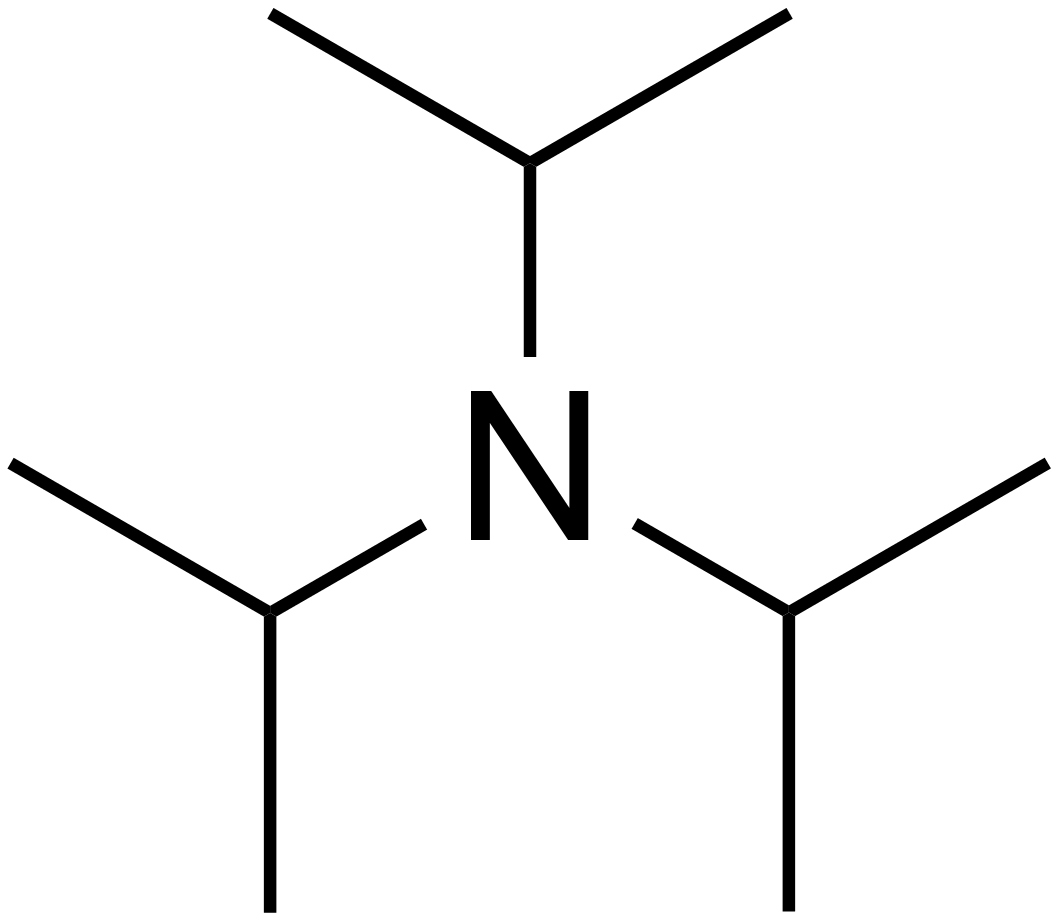
- Skeletal formula of triisopropylamine

Names
- Preferred IUPAC name N,N-Di(propan-2-yl)propan-2-amine
- Other names Tri(propan-2-yl)amine (Triisopropyl)amine

Identifiers
CAS Number	3424-21-3
3D model (JSmol)	Interactive image
ChemSpider	55785
ECHA InfoCard	100.020.289
EC Number	222-317-5
PubChem CID	61924
UNII	Y67CF9Z56L
CompTox Dashboard (EPA)	DTXSID1042493
- InChI: InChI=1S/C9H21N/c1-7(2)10(8(3)4)9(5)6/h7-9H,1-6H3 Key: RKBCYCFRFCNLTO-UHFFFAOYSA-N
- SMILES: CC(C)N(C(C)C)C(C)C

Properties
Chemical formula	C_{9}H_{21}N
Molar mass	143.274 g·mol^{−1}
Appearance	Colorless liquid
Odor	Ichthyal, ammoniacal
Density	0.752 g/cm^{3}
Boiling point	131.8 °C (269.2 °F; 404.9 K) 47°C at 1.9 kPa

Related compounds
Related amines	Dimethylamine; Trimethylamine; N-Nitrosodimethylamine; Diethylamine; Triethylamine; Diisopropylamine; Dimethylaminopropylamine; Diethylenetriamine; N,N-Diisopropylethylamine; Tris(2-aminoethyl)amine; Mechlorethamine; HN1 (nitrogen mustard); HN3 (nitrogen mustard)
Related compounds	Unsymmetrical dimethylhydrazine; Biguanide; Dithiobiuret; Agmatine
- Except where otherwise noted, data are given for materials in their standard state (at 25 °C [77 °F], 100 kPa). verify (what is ?) Infobox references

Triisopropylamine is an organic chemical compound consisting of three isopropyl groups bound to a central nitrogen atom. As a hindered tertiary amine, it can be used as a non-nucleophilic base and as a stabilizer for polymers; however, its applications are limited by its relatively high cost and difficult synthesis.

== Structure ==
In the early 1990s, theoretical studies and electron diffraction analysis of the 3D structure of the molecule, in the gas phase or in non-polar solvents, indicated that the bonds between the nitrogen atom and the three carbon atoms were nearly coplanar in the ground state, instead of forming a trigonal pyramid as in simpler amines. The average C-N-C angle was claimed to be 119.2°, much closer to the 120° of the flat configuration than to the 111.8° of trimethylamine. This peculiarity was attributed to steric hindrance by the bulky isopropyl radicals. However, in 1998 X-ray diffraction analysis of the crystallized solid showed that the C_{3}N core is actually pyramidal, with the N atom lying approximately 0.28 Å off the carbons' plane (whereas in trimethylamine the distance is about 0.45 Å). However the researchers could not rule out the crystal field effect as the cause of the asymmetry.

The C-C-C planes of the isopropyl groups are slightly tilted (about 5°) relative to the threefold symmetry axis of the C_{3}N core.

== Even more hindered amines ==
Triisopropylamine is notable as being among the most sterically hindered amines currently known. To date, di(tert-alkyl)(sec-alkyl)amines like di-tert-butyl(isopropyl)amine (^{t}Bu_{2}^{i}PrN) and diadamantylcyclohexylamine (Ad_{2}CyN) have been prepared in low yield, as have a handful of tri-tert-alkylamines in which two of the tert-alkyl groups are tied together in a five-membered ring. As a result of the extreme steric crowding, these tertiary amines were found to be unusually susceptible to β-elimination to give an alkene and a secondary amine, even at temperatures close to room temperature (as low as 40 °C). As a result of these and other synthetic difficulties, the authors of a 2018 study predict that the even more crowded tri-tert-butylamine (^{t}Bu_{3}N, unknown as of 2023) will likely remain a longstanding unsolved synthetic challenge, even though ab initio calculations indicate that it would be of reasonable stability if it could be prepared. Calculations indicate that tri-tert-butylamine should be planar at nitrogen. Though arguably a more hindered molecule, the structurally analogous tri-tert-alkyl carbinol 2,2,4,4-tetramethyl-3-t-butyl-pentane-3-ol (tri-tert-butylcarbinol, ^{t}Bu_{3}COH), has been known for decades (prepared by Bartlett and coworkers in 1945).

== Preparation ==
Steric effects make triisopropylamine difficult to synthesise and unlike less hindered tertiary amines (such as triethylamine) it cannot be produced by the alkylation of ammonia with alcohol; attempts to do so stall at diisopropylamine. It can be prepared from diisopropylamine on the laboratory scale:

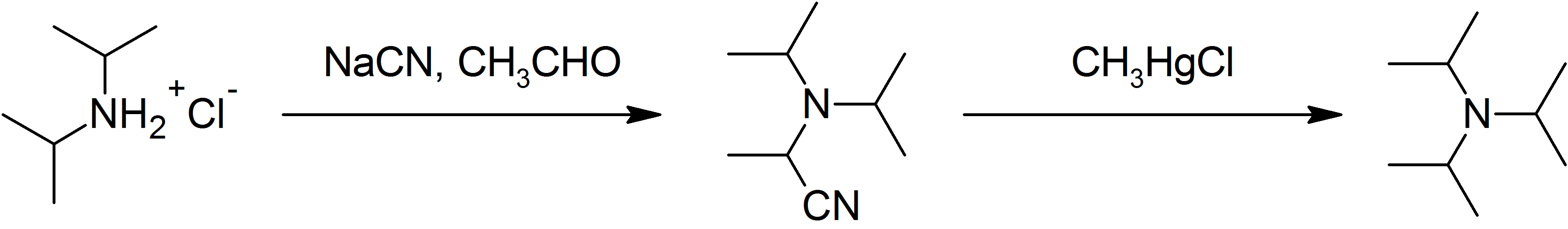

== See also ==
- Tetra-tert-butylethylene
