= Triethylamine =

- Skeletal formula of triethylamine

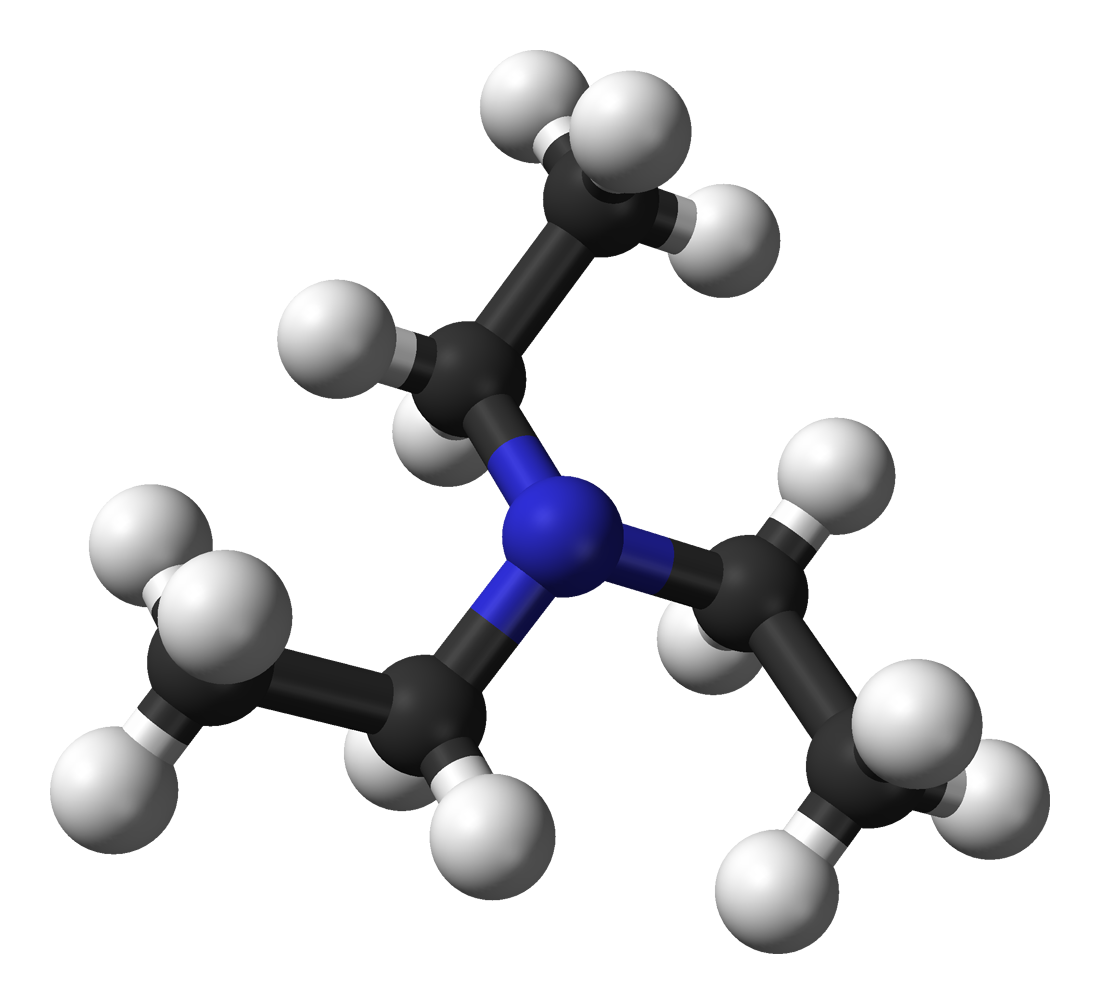
Ball and stick model of triethylamine
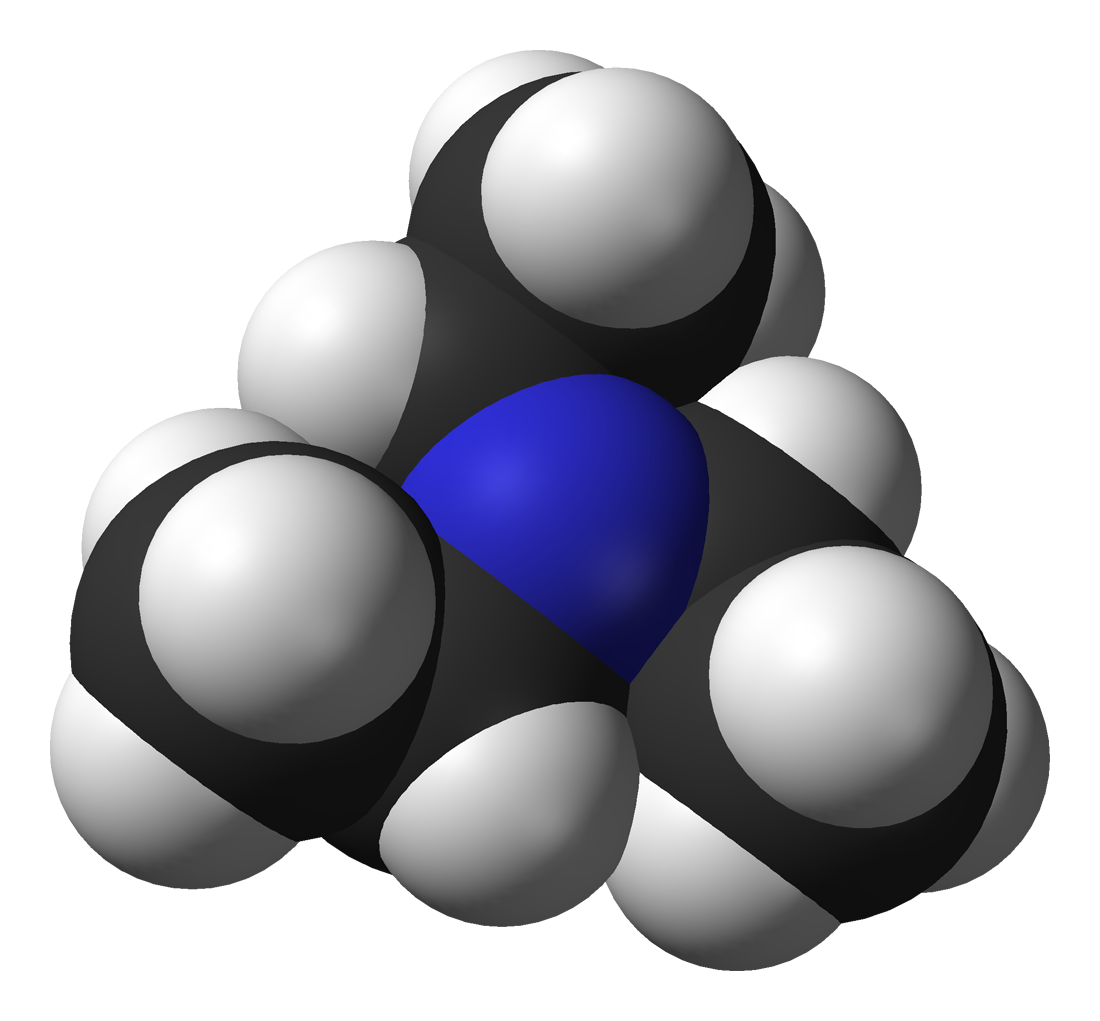
Spacefill model of triethylamine

Names
- Preferred IUPAC name N,N-Diethylethanamine
- Other names (Triethyl)amine; Triethylamine (no longer IUPAC name)

Identifiers
CAS Number	121-44-8
3D model (JSmol)	Interactive image
Abbreviations	TEA
Beilstein Reference	605283
ChEBI	CHEBI:35026
ChEMBL	ChEMBL284057
ChemSpider	8158
ECHA InfoCard	100.004.064
EC Number	204-469-4
KEGG	C14691
MeSH	triethylamine
PubChem CID	8471
RTECS number	YE0175000
UNII	VOU728O6AY
UN number	1296
CompTox Dashboard (EPA)	DTXSID301024181 DTXSID3024366, DTXSID301024181
- InChI: InChI=1S/C6H15N/c1-4-7(5-2)6-3/h4-6H2,1-3H3 Key: ZMANZCXQSJIPKH-UHFFFAOYSA-N
- SMILES: CCN(CC)CC

Properties
Chemical formula	C_{6}H_{15}N
Molar mass	101.193 g·mol^{−1}
Appearance	Colourless liquid
Odor	Fishy, ammoniacal
Density	0.7255 g mL^{−1}
Melting point	−114.70 °C; −174.46 °F; 158.45 K
Boiling point	88.6 to 89.8 °C; 191.4 to 193.5 °F; 361.7 to 362.9 K
Solubility in water	112.4 g/L at 20 °C
Solubility	miscible with organic solvents
log P	1.647
Vapor pressure	6.899–8.506 kPa
Henry's law constant (k_{H})	66 μmol Pa^{−1} kg^{−1}
Acidity (pK_{a})	10.75 (for the conjugate acid) (H_{2}O), 9.00 (DMSO)
Magnetic susceptibility (χ)	−81.4·10^{−6} cm^{3}/mol
Refractive index (n_{D})	1.401

Thermochemistry
Heat capacity (C)	216.43 J K^{−1} mol^{−1}
Std enthalpy of formation (Δ_{f}H^{⦵}_{298})	−169 kJ mol^{−1}
Std enthalpy of combustion (Δ_{c}H^{⦵}_{298})	−4.37763 to −4.37655 MJ mol^{−1}

Hazards
- GHS labelling
Pictograms	(GHS02: Flammable) (GHS05: Corrosive) (GHS07: Exclamation mark)
Signal word	Danger
Hazard statements	H225, H302, H312, H314, H332
Precautionary statements	P210, P280, P305+P351+P338, P310
NFPA 704 (fire diamond)	3 3 0
Flash point	−15 °C (5 °F; 258 K)
Autoignition temperature	312 °C (594 °F; 585 K)
Explosive limits	1.2–8%
Threshold limit value (TLV)	2 ppm (8 mg/m^{3}) (TWA), 4 ppm (17 mg/m^{3}) (STEL)
- Lethal dose or concentration (LD, LC)
LD_{50} (median dose)	580 mg kg^{−1} (dermal, rabbit); 730 mg kg^{−1} (oral, rat)
LC_{Lo} (lowest published)	1425 ppm (mouse, 2 hr)
- NIOSH (US health exposure limits)
PEL (Permissible)	TWA 25 ppm (100 mg/m^{3})
REL (Recommended)	None established
IDLH (Immediate danger)	200 ppm

Related compounds
Related amines	Dimethylamine; Trimethylamine; N-Nitrosodimethylamine; Diethylamine; Diisopropylamine; Dimethylaminopropylamine; Diethylenetriamine; N,N-Diisopropylethylamine; Triisopropylamine; Tris(2-aminoethyl)amine; Mechlorethamine; HN1 (nitrogen mustard); HN3 (nitrogen mustard)
Related compounds	Unsymmetrical dimethylhydrazine; Biguanide; Dithiobiuret; Agmatine
- Except where otherwise noted, data are given for materials in their standard state (at 25 °C [77 °F], 100 kPa). verify (what is ?) Infobox references

Triethylamine is the chemical compound with the formula N(CH_{2}CH_{3})_{3}, commonly abbreviated Et_{3}N. Like triethanolamine and the tetraethylammonium ion, it is often abbreviated TEA. It is a colourless volatile liquid with a strong fishy odor reminiscent of ammonia. Like diisopropylethylamine (Hünig's base), triethylamine is commonly employed in organic synthesis, usually as a base.

== Synthesis and properties ==
Triethylamine is prepared by the alkylation of ammonia with ethanol:

NH_{3} + 3 CH_{3}CH_{2}OH → N(CH_{2}CH_{3})_{3} + 3 H_{2}O

The pK_{a} of protonated triethylamine is 10.75, and it can be used to prepare buffer solutions at that pH. The hydrochloride salt, triethylamine hydrochloride (triethylammonium chloride [(CH_{3}CH_{2})_{3}NH]^{+}Cl^{−}), is a colorless, odorless, and hygroscopic powder, which decomposes when heated to 261 °C.

Triethylamine is soluble in water to the extent of 112.4 g/L at 20 °C. It is also miscible in common organic solvents, such as acetone, ethanol, and diethyl ether.

Laboratory samples of triethylamine can be purified by distilling from calcium hydride.

In alkane solvents triethylamine is a Lewis base that forms adducts with a variety of Lewis acids, such as I_{2} and phenols. Owing to its steric bulk, it forms complexes with transition metals reluctantly.

== Applications ==
Triethylamine is commonly employed in organic synthesis as a base. For example, it is commonly used as a base during the preparation of esters and amides from acyl chlorides. Such reactions lead to the production of hydrogen chloride which combines with triethylamine to form the salt triethylamine hydrochloride, commonly called triethylammonium chloride. (R, R' = alkyl, aryl):

R_{2}NH + R'C(O)Cl + (CH_{3}CH_{2})_{3}N → R'C(O)NR_{2} + [(CH_{3}CH_{2})_{3}NH]^{+}Cl^{−}

Like other tertiary amines, it catalyzes the formation of urethane foams and epoxy resins. It is also useful in dehydrohalogenation reactions and Swern oxidations.

Triethylamine is readily alkylated to give the corresponding quaternary ammonium salt:

RI + (CH_{3}CH_{2})_{3}N → [(CH_{3}CH_{2})_{3}NR]^{+}I^{−}

Triethylamine is mainly used in the production of quaternary ammonium compounds for textile auxiliaries and quaternary ammonium salts of dyes. It is also a catalyst and acid neutralizer for condensation reactions and is useful as an intermediate for manufacturing medicines, pesticides and other chemicals.

Triethylamine salts, like any other tertiary ammonium salts, are used as an ion-interaction reagent in ion interaction chromatography, due to their amphiphilic properties. Unlike quaternary ammonium salts, tertiary ammonium salts are much more volatile, therefore mass spectrometry can be used while performing analysis.

=== Niche uses ===
Triethylamine is commonly used in the production of anionic polyurethane dispersions (resins dispersed in water rather than solvents) as a neutralizing agent.

Triethylamine is used to give salts of various carboxylic acid-containing pesticides, e.g. Triclopyr and 2,4-dichlorophenoxyacetic acid.

Triethylamine is the active ingredient in FlyNap, a product for anesthetizing fruit flies. It is also used in mosquito and vector control labs to anesthetize mosquitoes. This is done to preserve any viral material that might be present during species identification.

The bicarbonate salt of triethylamine (often abbreviated TEAB, triethylammonium bicarbonate [(CH_{3}CH_{2})_{3}NH]^{+}HCO^{−}_{3}) is useful in reverse phase chromatography, often in a gradient to purify nucleotides and other biomolecules.

Triethylamine was discovered by the Germans during the early 1940s to be hypergolic in combination with nitric acid, and was used as a component in the German Wasserfall rocket. The Soviet Scud missile used TG-02, a mixture of 50% xylidine and 50% triethylamine as a starting fluid to ignite its rocket engine.

=== Natural occurrence ===
Hawthorn flowers have a heavy, complicated scent, the distinctive part of which is triethylamine, which is also one of the first chemicals produced by a dead human body when it begins to decay. Due to the scent, it is considered unlucky in British culture to bring hawthorn into a house. Gangrene and semen are also said to possess a similar odour.
