= HN3 (nitrogen mustard) =

- Skeletal formula of 2-Chloro-N,N-bis(2-chloroethyl)ethanamine

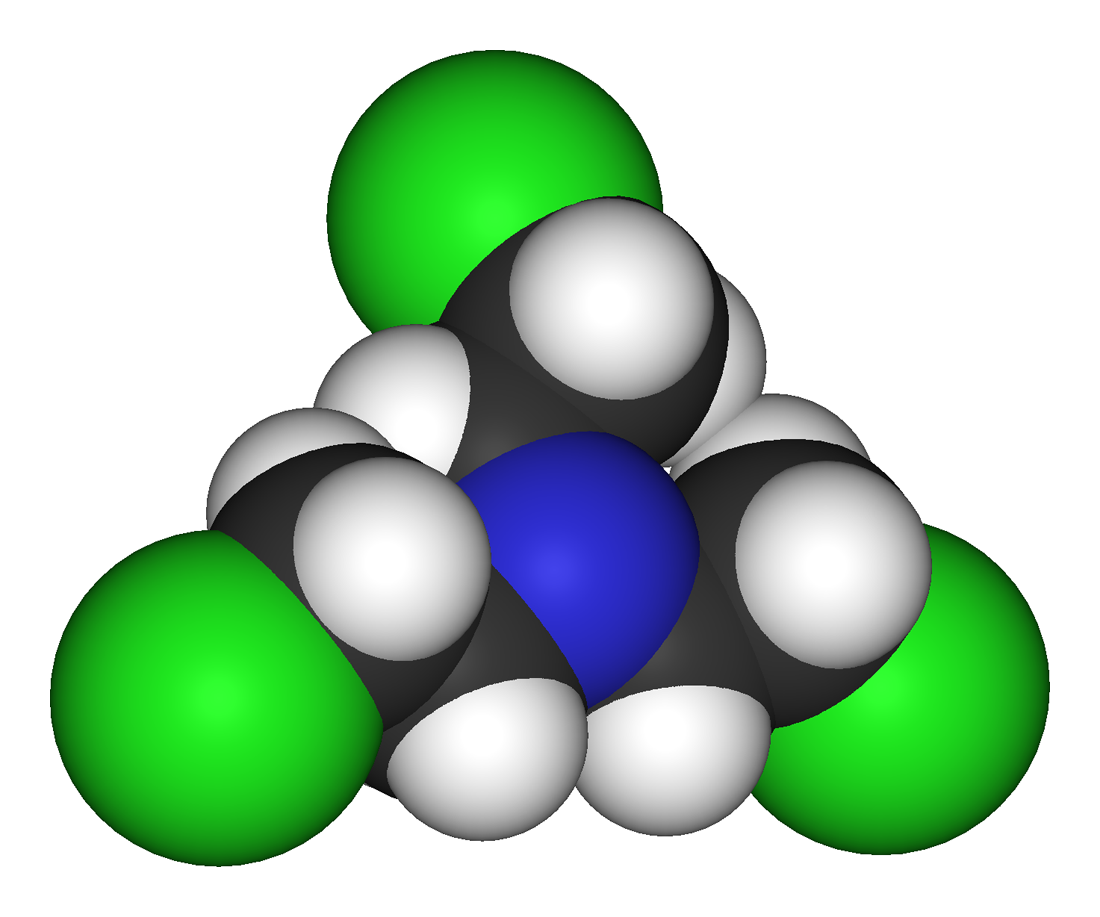
- Spacefill model of 2-Chloro-N,N-bis(2-chloroethyl)ethanamine

Names
- Preferred IUPAC name 2-Chloro-N,N-bis(2-chloroethyl)ethanamine
- Other names Trichlormethine; Tris(2-chloroethyl)amine; EA-1053; TL-145

Identifiers
CAS Number	555-77-1
3D model (JSmol)	Interactive image
ChEMBL	ChEMBL443613
ChemSpider	5360
MeSH	2,2',2+-trichlorotriethylamine
PubChem CID	5561
UNII	66WBM7N0NM
CompTox Dashboard (EPA)	DTXSID7048744
- InChI: InChI=1S/C6H12Cl3N/c7-1-4-10(5-2-8)6-3-9/h1-6H2 Key: FDAYLTPAFBGXAB-UHFFFAOYSA-N
- SMILES: ClCCN(CCCl)CCCl

Properties
Chemical formula	C_{6}H_{12}Cl_{3}N
Molar mass	204.52 g·mol^{−1}
Appearance	Colourless liquid
Odor	Fishy, ammoniacal
Density	1.24 g mL^{−1}
Melting point	−4 to −3.7 °C (24.8 to 25.3 °F; 269.1 to 269.4 K)
Boiling point	143 °C (289 °F; 416 K)
log P	1.306

Related compounds
Related amines	Dimethylamine; Trimethylamine; N-Nitrosodimethylamine; Diethylamine; Triethylamine; Diisopropylamine; Dimethylaminopropylamine; Diethylenetriamine; N,N-Diisopropylethylamine; Triisopropylamine; Tris(2-aminoethyl)amine; Mechlorethamine; HN1 (nitrogen mustard)
Related compounds	Unsymmetrical dimethylhydrazine; Biguanide; Dithiobiuret; Agmatine
- Except where otherwise noted, data are given for materials in their standard state (at 25 °C [77 °F], 100 kPa). verify (what is ?) Infobox references

2-Chloro-N,N-bis(2-chloroethyl)ethanamine, also known as trichlormethine, tris(2-chloroethyl)amine is the organic compound with the formula N(CH_{2}CH_{2}Cl)_{3}. Often abbreviated HN3 or HN-3, it is a powerful blister agent and a nitrogen mustard used for chemical warfare. HN3 was the last of the nitrogen mustard agents developed. It was designed as a military agent and is the only one of the nitrogen mustards that is still used for military purposes. It is the principal representative of the nitrogen mustards because its vesicant properties are almost equal to those of HD and thus the analogy between the two types of mustard is the strongest. As a vesicant the use and production is strongly restricted within the Chemical Weapons Convention where it is classified as a Schedule 1 substance.

== Mode of action ==
Nitrogen mustards react via an initial cyclization to the corresponding quaternary aziridine salt. The rate of this reaction is pH dependent because the protonated amine cannot cyclize.

== Applications ==
HN-3 has found some applications in chemotherapy, e.g., for Hodgkin's disease, and in some compound semiconductor research but it is mainly of interest for its military uses and is the only one of these agents that remains anywhere as a military agent. These agents are more immediately toxic than the sulfur mustards.

== Exposure ==
HN-3 can be absorbed into the body by inhalation, ingestion, eye contact, and skin contact (though inhalation is the most common). The chemical is extremely toxic and may damage the eyes, skin, and respiratory tract and suppress the immune system. HN-3 penetrates and binds quickly to cells of the body, but its health effects develop slowly. The full extent of cellular injury may not be known for days.

== See also ==
- Nitrogen mustard
