= Ethylcholine mustard =

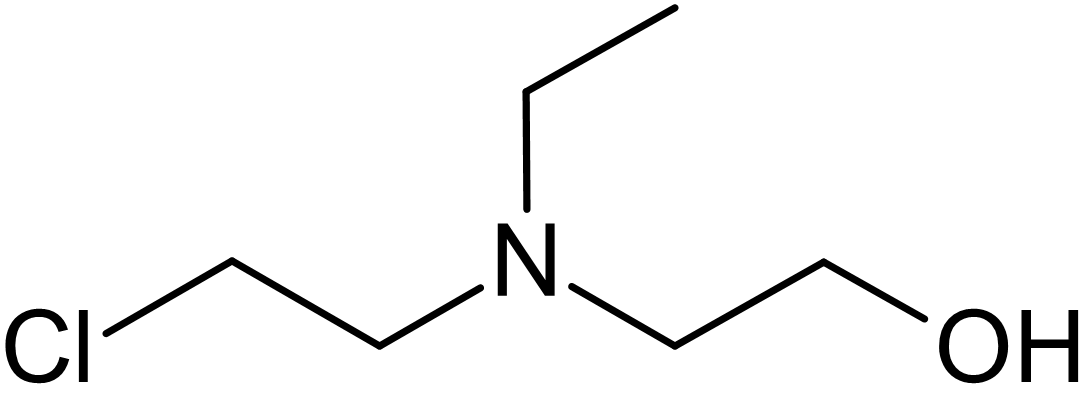

Names
- Other names HN1 chlorohydrin

Identifiers
CAS Number	4669-20-9
3D model (JSmol)	Interactive image
ChemSpider	172807
PubChem CID	199656
CompTox Dashboard (EPA)	DTXSID70196904
- InChI: InChI=1S/C6H14ClNO/c1-2-8(4-3-7)5-6-9/h9H,2-6H2,1H3 Key: ODCWAALEHCNIBY-UHFFFAOYSA-N
- SMILES: CCN(CCO)CCCl

Properties
Chemical formula	C_{6}H_{14}ClNO
Molar mass	151.63 g·mol^{−1}
- Except where otherwise noted, data are given for materials in their standard state (at 25 °C [77 °F], 100 kPa). Infobox references

Ethylcholine mustard is a neurotoxic nitrogen mustard that destroys cholinergic neurons. It's the hydrolysis product of the HN1 vesicant.

== Mechanism of action ==
Under aqueous condition, ethylcholine mustard forms the highly reactive ethylcholine aziridinium (AF64A) ion. AF64A is transported into cholinergic neurons by the choline transporter. AF64A irreversibly inhibits the choline acetyltransferase and thereby inhibits acetylcholine synthesis. AF64A can also produce cytotoxic effects, leading to cell death.

The aziridinium ion can be isolated as picrylsulfonate salt.

== See also ==
- HN1 (nitrogen mustard)
