= Chlormethine =

- Skeletal formula of mechlorethamine

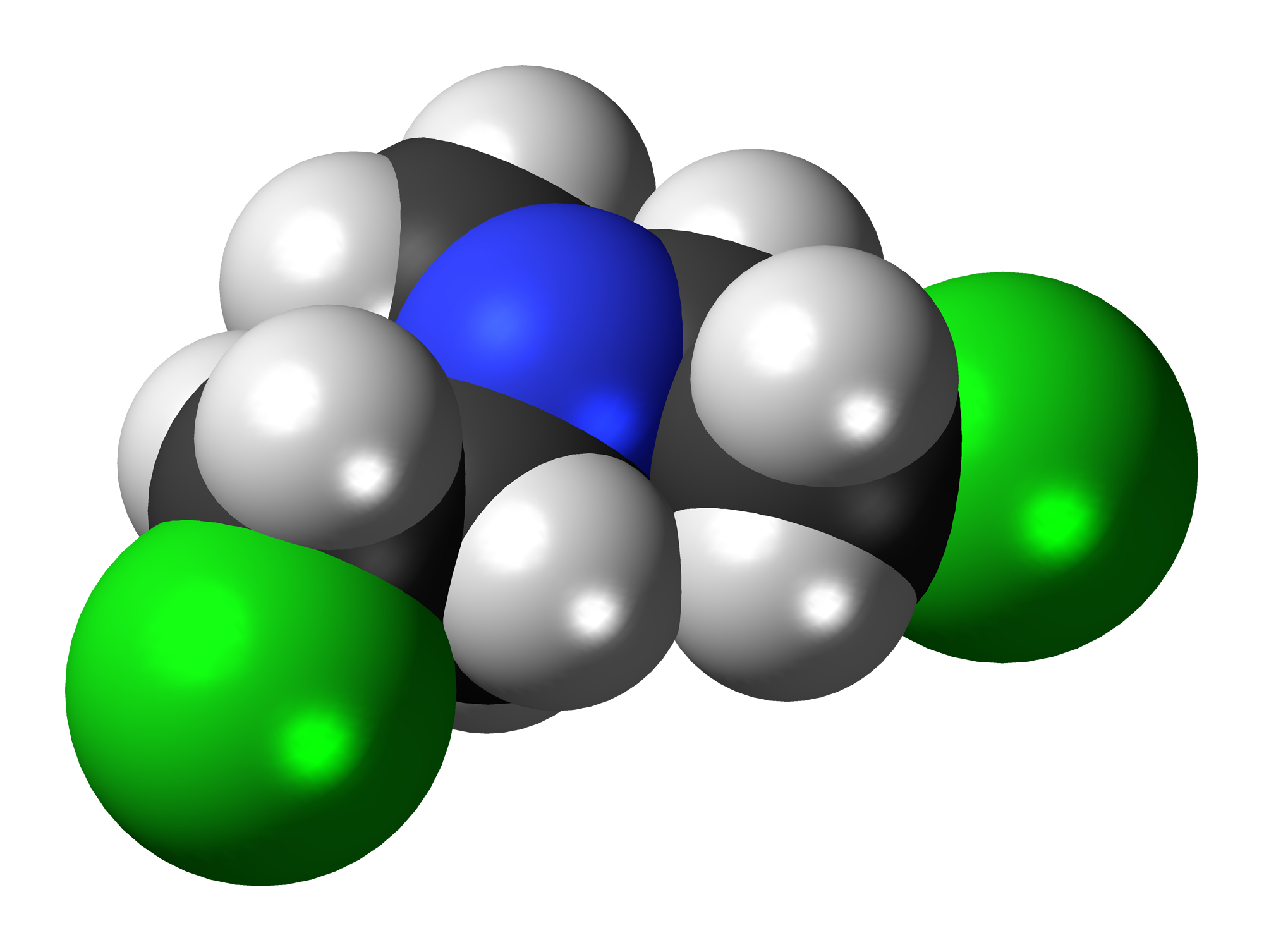

Names
- IUPAC name 2-Chloro-N-(2-chloroethyl)-N-methylethanamine
- Other names: Bis(2-chloroethyl)(methyl)amine; mechlorethamine; mustine; HN-2; Ledaga

Identifiers
CAS Number	51-75-2
3D model (JSmol)	Interactive image
ChEBI	CHEBI:28925
ChEMBL	ChEMBL427
ChemSpider	3893
DrugBank	DB00888
ECHA InfoCard	100.000.110
EC Number	200-120-5
KEGG	D0767
MeSH	Mechlorethamine
PubChem CID	4033
RTECS number	IA1750000
UNII	50D9XSG0VR
UN number	2810
CompTox Dashboard (EPA)	DTXSID2020975
- InChI: InChI=1S/C5H11Cl2N/c1-8(4-2-6)5-3-7/h2-5H2,1H3 Key: HAWPXGHAZFHHAD-UHFFFAOYSA-N
- SMILES: CN(CCCl)CCCl

Properties
Chemical formula	C_{5}H_{11}Cl_{2}N
Molar mass	156.05 g·mol^{−1}
Appearance	Colorless liquid
Odor	Fishy, ammoniacal
log P	0.91

Pharmacology
ATC code	D08AX04 (WHO) L01AA05 (WHO)
Pregnancy category	AU: B3
Routes of administration	Intracavitary; Intrapericardial; Intravenous; Topical
- Pharmacokinetics
Biological half-life	<1 minute
Excretion	50% (Kidney)
Legal status	AU: S4 (Prescription only); CA: ℞-only; EU: Rx-only; In general: ℞ (Prescription only)

Related compounds
Related amines	Dimethylamine; Trimethylamine; N-Nitrosodimethylamine; Diethylamine; Triethylamine; Diisopropylamine; Dimethylaminopropylamine; Diethylenetriamine; N,N-Diisopropylethylamine; Triisopropylamine; Tris(2-aminoethyl)amine; HN1 (nitrogen mustard); HN3 (nitrogen mustard)
- Except where otherwise noted, data are given for materials in their standard state (at 25 °C [77 °F], 100 kPa). verify (what is ?) Infobox references

Chlormethine (INN, BAN), also known as mechlorethamine (USAN, USP), mustine, HN2, and (in post-Soviet states) embikhin (эмбихин), is a nitrogen mustard sold under the brand name Mustargen among others. It is the prototype of alkylating agents, a group of anticancer chemotherapeutic drugs. It works by binding to DNA, crosslinking two strands and preventing cell duplication. It binds to the N7 nitrogen on the DNA base guanine. As the chemical is a blister agent, its use is strongly restricted within the Chemical Weapons Convention where it is classified as a Schedule 1 substance.

Mechlorethamine belongs to the group of nitrogen mustard alkylating agents.

== Uses ==
It has been derivatized into the estrogen analogue estramustine phosphate, used to treat prostate cancer. It can also be used in chemical warfare where it has the code-name HN2. This chemical is a form of nitrogen mustard gas and a powerful vesicant. Historically, some uses of mechlorethamine have included lymphoid malignancies such as lymphoma, chronic myelogenous leukemia, polycythemia vera, and lung cancer. Mechlorethamine is often administered intravenously, but when compounded into a topical formulation it can also be used to treat skin diseases. There have been studies demonstrating that topical administration of mechlorethamine has efficacy in mycosis fungoides-type cutaneous T cell lymphoma.

Another use of chlormethine is in the synthesis of pethidine (meperidine).

== Side effects and toxicity ==
Mechlorethamine is a highly toxic medication, especially for women who are pregnant, breastfeeding, or of childbearing age. At high enough levels, exposure can be fatal.

The adverse effects of mechlorethamine depend on the formulation. When used in chemical warfare, it can cause immunosuppression and damage to mucous membranes of the eyes, skin, and respiratory tract. Mucous membranes and damp or damaged skin are more affected by exposure to HN-2. Though symptoms of exposure are generally delayed, the DNA damage it causes occurs very quickly. More serious exposures cause symptoms to develop sooner. Eye symptoms develop first, in the first 1–2 hours (severe exposure) or 3–12 hours (mild to moderate exposure) followed by airway (2-6/12–24 hours) and skin symptoms (6–48 hours). Hot, humid weather shortens the latent (symptom-free) period.

Symptoms of toxic exposure to HN-2 vary based on the route of exposure. Eye exposure causes lacrimation (tear production), burning, irritation, itching, a feeling of grittiness or dryness, blepharospasm (spasms of the eyelid), and miosis (pinpoint pupils). More severe cases cause edema (swelling from fluid accumulation) in the eyelids, photophobia (extreme sensitivity to light), severe pain, corneal ulceration, and blindness.

Inhalation of chlormethine damages the upper and lower airways sequentially, with more severe exposures causing faster damage that afflicts lower parts of the respiratory tract. Early symptoms include rhinorrhea (runny nose), epistaxis (nosebleed), toneless voice, sneezing, barking cough, and dyspnea (in smokers and asthmatics). Later symptoms include pain in the nose/sinuses and inflammation of the airway. In severe cases, there may be epithelial necrosis throughout the respiratory tract, causing pseudomembrane formation, which can obstruct the airway. Pneumonia may develop and prove fatal.

Skin exposure mainly causes erythema (redness) and vesication (blistering) at first, but absorption through the skin causes systemic toxicity. In cases where more than 25% of the skin is affected, fatal exposure is likely to have occurred.

Though ingestion is uncommon, if mechlorethamine is swallowed it causes severe chemical burns to the gastrointestinal tract and concomitant nausea, vomiting, diarrhea, abdominal pain, and hemorrhage.

Long-term effects of acute or chronic chlormethine exposure are caused by damage to the immune system. White blood cell counts drop, increasing the risk of infection, and red blood cell and platelet counts may also drop due to bone marrow damage. Chronic eye infections may result from exposure, but blindness is temporary. Long-term effects on the respiratory system include anosmia (inability to smell), ageusia (inability to taste), inflammation, chronic infections, fibrosis, and cancer. Skin that has been damaged by HN2 can change pigmentation or become scarred, and may eventually develop cancer.

== History ==
The effect of vesicant (blister) agents in the form of mustard gas (sulfur mustard, Bis(2-chloroethyl) sulfide) on bone marrow and white blood cells had been known since the First World War. In 1935 several lines of chemical and biological research yielded results that would be explored after the start of the Second World War. The vesicant action of a family of chemicals related to the sulfur mustards, but with nitrogen substituting for sulfur was discovered—the "nitrogen mustards" were born. The particular nitrogen mustard chlormethine (mechlorethamine) was first synthesized. And the action of sulfur mustard on tumors in laboratory animals was investigated for the first time.

After the US entry into the Second World War the nitrogen mustards were candidate chemical warfare agents and research on them was initiated by the Office of Scientific Research and Development (OSRD). The OSRD let contracts to study them to two universities—Yale University and the University of Chicago. Inspired perhaps by the preliminary research in 1935, independently both groups thought to test whether a medically useful differential toxicity between animals and animal tumors existed. The Yale pharmacologists Louis Goodman and Alfred Gilman were the first to conduct a clinical trial, on 27 August 1942, using the agent HN3 (tris(2-chloroethyl)amine) on a patient known as J.D.

The next year the Chicago group, led by Leon O. Jacobson, conducted trials with HN2 (chlormethine) which was the only agent in this group to see eventual clinical use. Wartime secrecy prevented any of this ground-breaking work on chemotherapy from being published, but papers were released once wartime secrecy ended, in 1946.

== Chemistry ==
Chlormethine is combustible and becomes explosive under extreme conditions. It can react with metals to form gaseous hydrogen.
