= HN3 =

HN3 may refer to:

- Tris(2-chloroethyl)amine or HN3, a nitrogen mustard
- Hydrazoic acid or HN_{3}
