= C6H18N4 =

The molecular formula C_{6}H_{18}N_{4} may refer to:

- Triethylenetetramine, an organic compound with the formula [CH_{2}NHCH_{2}CH_{2}NH_{2}]_{2}
- Tris(2-aminoethyl)amine, the organic compound with the formula N(CH_{2}CH_{2}NH_{2})_{3}
