= FlyNap =

Fruit fly anesthetic

FlyNap is an anesthetic mixture produced by the Carolina Biological Supply Company. The product anesthetizes the Drosophila melanogaster (fruit fly) and other small insects for at least 30 minutes and is commonly used in educational institutes and laboratories for reducing the movement of the fruit flies such that they can be sorted or studied under the microscope or dissecting scope. The liquid is applied to a small brush, which is left in the closed container where the flies are contained until they have ceased moving.

== Constitution ==
FlyNap consists of a mixture of:

%	Chemical Name
50	Triethylamine
25	Fragrance (Neutralizer)
22.63	Ethanol
1.25	2-Propanol
1.13	Methanol
