= Phosphoramide =

Names
- IUPAC name Phosphoric triamide
- Other names: Diaminophosphorylamine; Phosphoric amide; Phosphoryl triamide; Triaminophosphine oxide

Identifiers
CAS Number	13597-72-3
3D model (JSmol)	Interactive image
ChemSpider	109920
PubChem CID	123317
UNII	M27WLZ6CWP
CompTox Dashboard (EPA)	DTXSID40159607
- InChI: InChI=1S/H6N3OP/c1-5(2,3)4/h(H6,1,2,3,4) Key: DMSZORWOGDLWGN-UHFFFAOYSA-N; InChI=1/H6N3OP/c1-5(2,3)4/h(H6,1,2,3,4) Key: DMSZORWOGDLWGN-UHFFFAOYAP
- SMILES: NP(=O)(N)N

Properties
Chemical formula	O=P(NH_{2})_{3}
Molar mass	95.042 g·mol^{−1}
Appearance	white solid
Solubility in water	good
Acidity (pK_{a})	<3.6
- Except where otherwise noted, data are given for materials in their standard state (at 25 °C [77 °F], 100 kPa). Infobox references

Phosphoramide is a chemical compound with the molecular formula O=P(NH_{2})_{3}. It is a derivative of phosphoric acid in which each of the hydroxyl groups have been replaced with an amino group. In bulk, the compound is a white solid which is soluble in polar solvents.

== Chemical properties ==
Phosphoramide arises from the reaction of phosphoryl chloride with ammonia. In moist air, it hydrolyzes to an ammonium salt:

2 H_{2}O + O=P(NH_{2})_{3} → [NH_{4}]^{+}[PO_{2}(OH)(NH_{2})]^{−} + NH_{3}

It reacts with sodium hydroxide with loss of ammonia:

NaOH + O=P(NH_{2})_{3} → Na^{+}[PO_{2}(NH_{2})_{2}]^{−} + NH_{3}

The related thiophosphoryl triamide compound S=P(NH_{2})_{3} was made from the reaction of thiophosphoryl chloride with ammonia.

== Phosphoramides ==
Phosphoramide is also the parent compound for a range of derivatives called phosphoramides. An example compound is the polar solvent hexamethylphosphoramide (HMPA).
