= Nitrogen mustard =

Family of chemical compounds

HN1 (bis(2-chloroethyl)ethylamine)

HN2 (bis(2-chloroethyl)methylamine, mustine)

HN3 (tris(2-chloroethyl)amine)

Nitrogen mustards (NMs) are cytotoxic organic compounds with the bis(2-chloroethyl)amino ((ClC_{2}H_{4})_{2}NR) functional group. Although originally produced as chemical warfare agents, they were the first chemotherapeutic agents for treatment of cancer. Nitrogen mustards are nonspecific DNA alkylating agents.

== Name ==
Nitrogen mustards are not related to the mustard plant or its active component allyl isothiocyanate; the name comes from the pungent smell of finished chemical weapons preparations.

== Chemical warfare ==
During World War II, nitrogen mustards were studied at the Yale School of Medicine by Alfred Gilman and Louis Goodman, and in December 1942, they started classified human clinical trials of nitrogen mustards for the treatment of lymphoma. In early December 1943, an incident during the air raid on Bari, Italy, led to the release of mustard gas that affected several hundred soldiers and civilians. Medical examination of the survivors showed a decreased number of lymphocytes. After World War II was over, the Bari incident and the Yale group's studies eventually converged prompting a search for other similar compounds. Due to its use in previous studies, the nitrogen mustard known as "HN2" became the first chemotherapy drug mustine.

== Other mustards ==
The nitrogen mustard drug mustine (HN2), is no longer commonly in use because of excessive toxicity. Other drugs developed from mustine include cyclophosphamide, chlorambucil, uramustine, melphalan, and bendamustine.

Nitrogen mustards that can be used for chemical warfare purposes are tightly regulated. Their weapon designations are:

- HN1: bis(2-chloroethyl)ethylamine
- HN2: bis(2-chloroethyl)methylamine
- HN3: tris(2-chloroethyl)amine

Normustard (mustine without a methyl group on the nitrogen atom; bis(2-chloroethyl)ethylamine) can be used in the synthesis of piperazine drugs such as mazapertine, aripiprazole & fluanisone. Canfosfamide was also made from normustard.

Many mustards have been developed into therapeutic agents:

- Cyclophosphamide, a phosphoramide
- Chlorambucil, an N-aryl mustard
- Melphalan, an N-aryl mustard
- Ifosfamide, a phosphoramide
- Trofosfamide, a phosphoramide
- Bendamustine, an N-aryl mustard
- Carmustine, one of several N-nitrosourea mustards

== Mechanism of action ==
Nitrogen mustards form cyclic ammonium ions (aziridinium ions) by intramolecular displacement of the chloride leaving group by the amine nitrogen atom. This aziridinium group then alkylates DNA once it is attacked by the N-7 nucleophilic center on the guanine base. A second attack after the displacement of the second chlorine atom forms the second alkylation step that results in the formation of interstrand cross-links (ICLs) as it was shown in the early 1960s. At that time, it was proposed that the ICLs were formed between N-7 atom of guanine residue in a 5'-d(GC) sequence. Later it was clearly demonstrated that nitrogen mustards form a 1,3 ICL in the 5'-d(GNC) sequence.

The strong cytotoxic effect caused by the formation of ICLs is what makes NMs an effective chemotherapeutic agent. Other compounds used in cancer chemotherapy that have the ability to form ICLs are cisplatin, mitomycin C, carmustine, and psoralen. These kinds of lesions are effective at forcing the cell to undergo apoptosis via p53, a protein which scans the genome for defects. Note that the alkylating damage itself is not cytotoxic and does not directly cause cell death.

== Safety ==
Nitrogen mustards are powerful and persistent blister agents. HN1, HN2, HN3 are therefore classified as Schedule 1 substances within the Chemical Weapons Convention. Production and use is therefore strongly restricted.

== See also ==
- Sulphur mustard
