= Dimethylamine =

Skeletal formula of dimethylamine
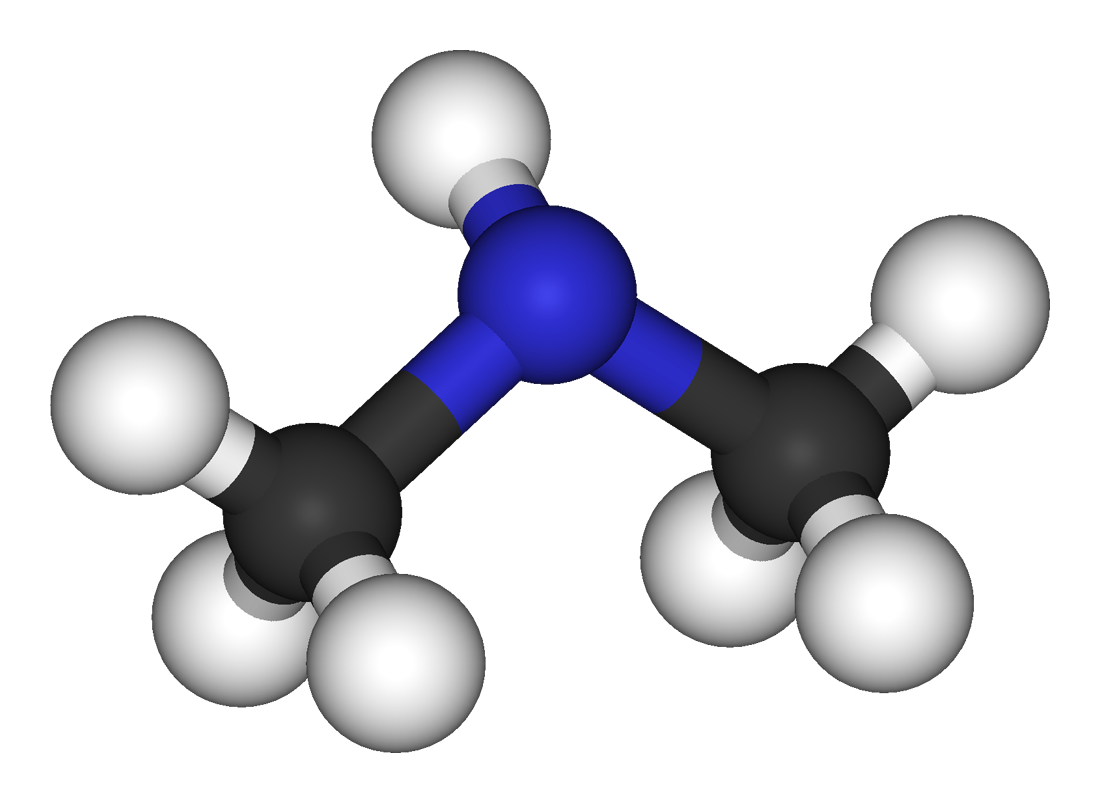
Ball and stick model of dimethylamine

Names
- Preferred IUPAC name N-Methylmethanamine
- Other names (Dimethyl)amine

Identifiers
CAS Number	124-40-3
3D model (JSmol)	Interactive image
Abbreviations	DMA; Me_{2}NH
Beilstein Reference	605257
ChEBI	CHEBI:17170
ChEMBL	ChEMBL120433
ChemSpider	654
ECHA InfoCard	100.004.272
EC Number	204-697-4
Gmelin Reference	849
KEGG	C00543
MeSH	dimethylamine
PubChem CID	674
RTECS number	IP8750000
UNII	ARQ8157E0Q
UN number	1032
CompTox Dashboard (EPA)	DTXSID5024057
- InChI: InChI=1S/C2H7N/c1-3-2/h3H,1-2H3 Key: ROSDSFDQCJNGOL-UHFFFAOYSA-N
- SMILES: CNC

Properties
Chemical formula	C_{2}H_{7}N
Molar mass	45.085 g·mol^{−1}
Appearance	Colorless gas
Odor	Fishy, ammoniacal
Density	649.6 kg m^{−3} (at 25 °C)
Melting point	−93.00 °C; −135.40 °F; 180.15 K
Boiling point	7 to 9 °C; 44 to 48 °F; 280 to 282 K
Solubility in water	1.540 kg L^{−1}
log P	−0.362
Vapor pressure	170.3 kPa (at 20 °C)
Henry's law constant (k_{H})	310 μmol Pa^{−1} kg^{−1}
Basicity (pK_{b})	3.29

Thermochemistry
Std enthalpy of formation (Δ_{f}H^{⦵}_{298})	−21 to −17 kJ mol^{−1}

Hazards
- GHS labelling
Pictograms	(GHS02: Flammable) (GHS05: Corrosive) (GHS07: Exclamation mark)
Signal word	Danger
Hazard statements	H220, H302, H315, H318, H332, H335
Precautionary statements	P210, P261, P280, P305+P351+P338
NFPA 704 (fire diamond)	2 4 0
Flash point	−6 °C (21 °F; 267 K) (liquid)
Autoignition temperature	401 °C (754 °F; 674 K)
Explosive limits	2.8–14.4%
- Lethal dose or concentration (LD, LC)
LD_{50} (median dose)	698 mg/kg (rat, oral); 316 mg/kg (mouse, oral); 240 mg/kg (rabbit, oral); 240 mg/kg (guinea pig, oral)
LC_{50} (median concentration)	4700 ppm (rat, 4 hr); 4540 ppm (rat, 6 hr); 7650 ppm (mouse, 2 hr)
- NIOSH (US health exposure limits)
PEL (Permissible)	TWA 10 ppm (18 mg/m^{3})
REL (Recommended)	TWA 10 ppm (18 mg/m^{3})
IDLH (Immediate danger)	500 ppm

Related compounds
Related amines	Trimethylamine; Diethylamine; Triethylamine; Diisopropylamine; Dimethylaminopropylamine; Triisopropylamine
Related compounds	Unsymmetrical dimethylhydrazine
- Except where otherwise noted, data are given for materials in their standard state (at 25 °C [77 °F], 100 kPa). verify (what is ?) Infobox references

Dimethylamine is an organic compound with the formula (CH_{3})_{2}NH. This secondary amine is a colorless, flammable gas with an ammonia-like odor. Dimethylamine is commonly encountered commercially as a solution in water at concentrations up to around 40%. An estimated 271,000 tons were produced in 2005.

== Structure and synthesis ==
The molecule consists of a nitrogen atom with two methyl substituents and one hydrogen. Dimethylamine is a weak base and the pKa of the ammonium CH_{3}-NH^{+}_{2}-CH_{3} is 10.73, a value above methylamine (10.64) and trimethylamine (9.79).

Dimethylamine reacts with acids to form salts, such as dimethylamine hydrochloride, an odorless white solid with a melting point of 171.5 °C. Dimethylamine is produced by catalytic reaction of methanol and ammonia at elevated temperatures and high pressure:

2 CH_{3}OH + NH_{3} → (CH_{3})_{2}NH + 2 H_{2}O

== Natural occurrence ==
Dimethylamine is found quite widely distributed in animals and plants, and is present in many foods at the level of a few mg/kg.

== Uses ==
Dimethylamine is a precursor to several industrially significant compounds. It reacts with carbon disulfide to give dimethyl dithiocarbamate, a precursor to zinc bis(dimethyldithiocarbamate) and other chemicals used in the sulfur vulcanization of rubber. Dimethylaminoethoxyethanol is manufactured by reacting dimethylamine and ethylene oxide. Other methods are also available producing streams rich in the substance which then need to be further purified. The solvents dimethylformamide and dimethylacetamide are derived from dimethylamine. It is raw material for the production of many agrichemicals and pharmaceuticals, such as dimefox and diphenhydramine, respectively. The chemical weapon tabun is derived from dimethylamine. The surfactant lauryl dimethylamine oxide is found in soaps and cleaning compounds. Unsymmetrical dimethylhydrazine, a rocket fuel, is prepared from dimethylamine.

(CH_{3})_{2}NH + NH_{2}Cl → (CH_{3})_{2}NNH_{2} ⋅ HCl

It is an attractant for boll weevils.

== Reactions ==
It is basic, in both the Lewis and Brønsted senses. It easily forms dimethylammonium salts upon treatment with acids. Deprotonation of dimethylamine can be effected with organolithium compounds. The resulting LiNMe_{2}, which adopts a cluster-like structure, serves as a source of Me_{2}N^{−}. This lithium amide has been used to prepare volatile metal complexes such as tetrakis(dimethylamido)titanium and pentakis(dimethylamido)tantalum.

It reacts with many carbonyl compounds. Aldehydes give aminals. For example reaction of dimethylamine and formaldehyde gives bis(dimethylamino)methane:

2 (CH_{3})_{2}NH + CH_{2}O → [(CH_{3})_{2}N]_{2}CH_{2} + H_{2}O

It converts esters to dimethylamides.

== Safety ==
Dimethylamine is not very toxic with the following LD_{50} values: 736 mg/kg (mouse, i.p.); 316 mg/kg (mouse, p.o.); 698 mg/kg (rat, p.o.); 3900 mg/kg (rat, dermal); 240 mg/kg (guinea pig or rabbit, p.o.).

Although not acutely toxic, dimethylamine undergoes nitrosation to give dimethylnitrosamine, a carcinogen.

== See also ==
- Methylamine
- Trimethylamine
