= Diethylamine =

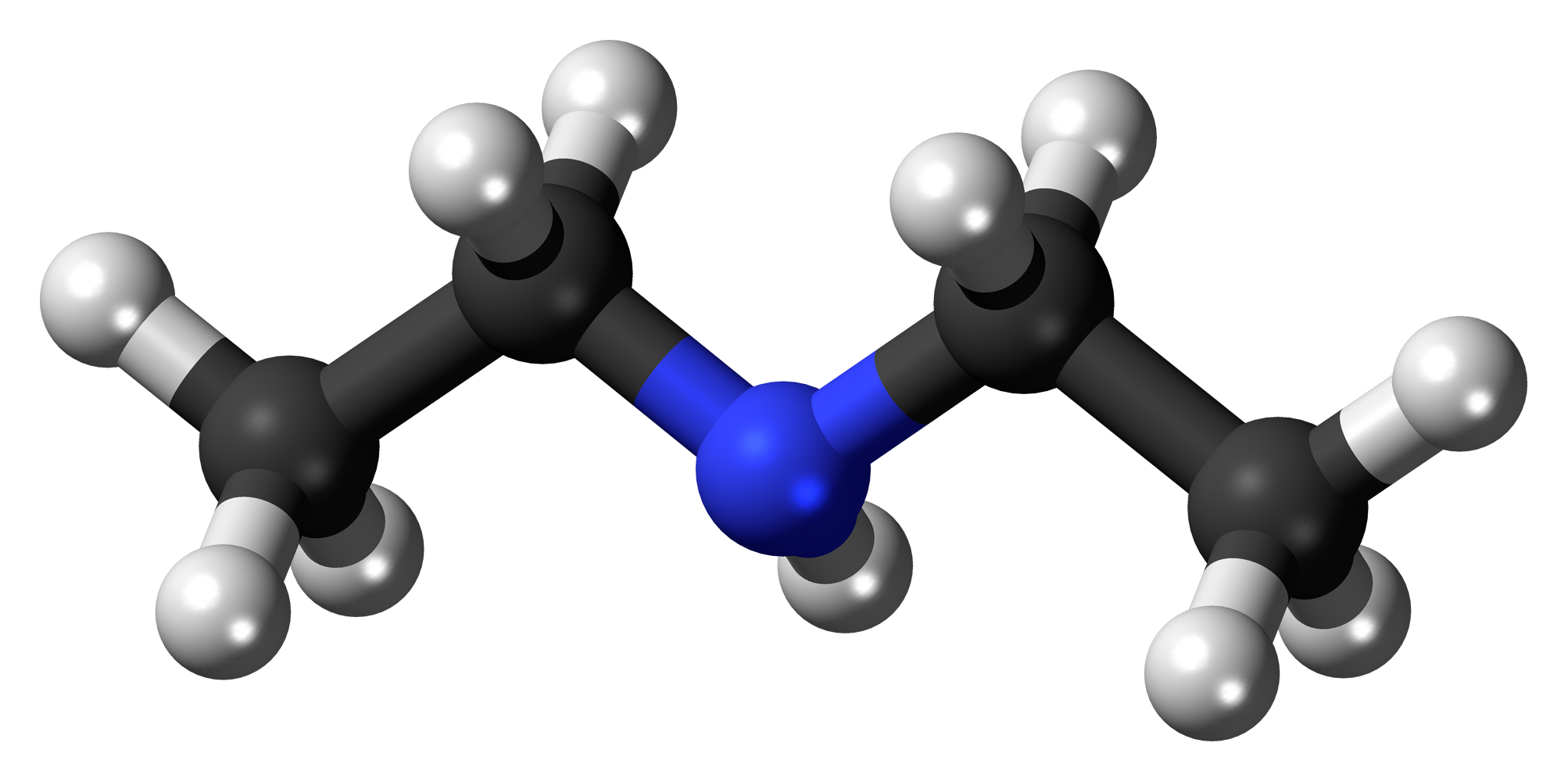

Names
- Preferred IUPAC name N-Ethylethanamine
- Other names (Diethyl)amine; Diethylamine (deprecated)

Identifiers
CAS Number	109-89-7
3D model (JSmol)	Interactive image
Beilstein Reference	605268
ChEBI	CHEBI:85259
ChEMBL	ChEMBL1189
ChemSpider	7730
ECHA InfoCard	100.003.380
EC Number	203-716-3
MeSH	diethylamine
PubChem CID	8021
RTECS number	HZ8750000
UNII	B035PIS86W
UN number	1154
CompTox Dashboard (EPA)	DTXSID501061682 DTXSID6021909, DTXSID501061682
- InChI: InChI=1S/C4H11N/c1-3-5-4-2/h5H,3-4H2,1-2H3 Key: HPNMFZURTQLUMO-UHFFFAOYSA-N
- SMILES: CCNCC

Properties
Chemical formula	C_{4}H_{11}N
Molar mass	73.139 g·mol^{−1}
Appearance	Colourless liquid
Odor	fishy, ammoniacal
Density	0.7074 g mL^{−1}
Melting point	−49.80 °C; −57.64 °F; 223.35 K
Boiling point	54.8 to 56.4 °C; 130.5 to 133.4 °F; 327.9 to 329.5 K
Solubility in water	Miscible
log P	0.657
Vapor pressure	24.2–97.5 kPa
Henry's law constant (k_{H})	150 μmol Pa^{−1} kg^{−1}
Acidity (pK_{a})	10.98 (of ammonium form)
Magnetic susceptibility (χ)	−56.8·10^{−6} cm^{3}/mol
Refractive index (n_{D})	1.385

Thermochemistry
Heat capacity (C)	178.1 J K^{−1} mol^{−1}
Std enthalpy of formation (Δ_{f}H^{⦵}_{298})	−131 kJ mol^{−1}
Std enthalpy of combustion (Δ_{c}H^{⦵}_{298})	−3.035 MJ mol^{−1}

Hazards
- GHS labelling
Pictograms	(GHS02: Flammable) (GHS05: Corrosive) (GHS07: Exclamation mark)
Signal word	Danger
Hazard statements	H225, H302, H312, H314, H332
Precautionary statements	P210, P280, P305+P351+P338, P310
NFPA 704 (fire diamond)	3 3 1
Flash point	−23 °C (−9 °F; 250 K)
Autoignition temperature	312 °C (594 °F; 585 K)
Explosive limits	1.8–10.1%
- Lethal dose or concentration (LD, LC)
LD_{50} (median dose)	540 mg/kg (rat, oral); 500 mg/kg (mouse, oral)
LC_{50} (median concentration)	4000 ppm (rat, 4 hr)
- NIOSH (US health exposure limits)
PEL (Permissible)	TWA 25 ppm (75 mg/m^{3})
REL (Recommended)	TWA 10 ppm (30 mg/m^{3}) ST 25 ppm (75 mg/m^{3})
IDLH (Immediate danger)	200 ppm
Safety data sheet (SDS)	hazard.com

Related compounds
Related amines	Ethylamine; Dimethylamine; Trimethylamine; Triethylamine; Diisopropylamine
- Except where otherwise noted, data are given for materials in their standard state (at 25 °C [77 °F], 100 kPa). verify (what is ?) Infobox references

Diethylamine is an organic compound with the formula (CH_{3}CH_{2})_{2}NH. It is classified as a secondary amine. It is a flammable, volatile weakly alkaline liquid that is miscible with most solvents. It is a colorless liquid, but commercial samples often appear brown due to impurities. It has a strong ammonia-like odor.

== Production and uses ==
The alumina-catalyzed reaction makes diethylamine from ethanol and ammonia. Diethylamine is obtained together with ethylamine and triethylamine. Annual production of the three ethylamines was estimated in 2000 to be 80,000,000 kg.

Diethylamine is used in the production of the corrosion inhibitor N,N-diethylaminoethanol, by reaction with ethylene oxide. It is also a precursor to a wide variety of other commercial products. It is also used in the illicit production of LSD.

== Organic chemistry ==
As the most abundantly available secondary amine that is liquid at room temperature, diethylamine has been extensively deployed in chemical synthesis. Its reactions illustrate the pattern seen for many other dialkylamines. It participates in Mannich reactions involving the installation of diethylaminomethyl substituents. Alkylation gives the tertiary amine. With trimethylsilyl chloride, it reacts to give the silylamide.

== Supramolecular structure ==
Supramolecular helix of diethylamine

Diethylamine is the smallest and simplest molecule that features a supramolecular helix as its lowest energy aggregate. Other similarly sized hydrogen-bonding molecules favor cyclic structures.

== Safety ==
Diethylamine has low toxicity, but the vapor causes transient impairment of vision.
