= N,N-Diisopropylethylamine =

Chemical compound

Skeletal formula of N,N-diisopropylethylamine
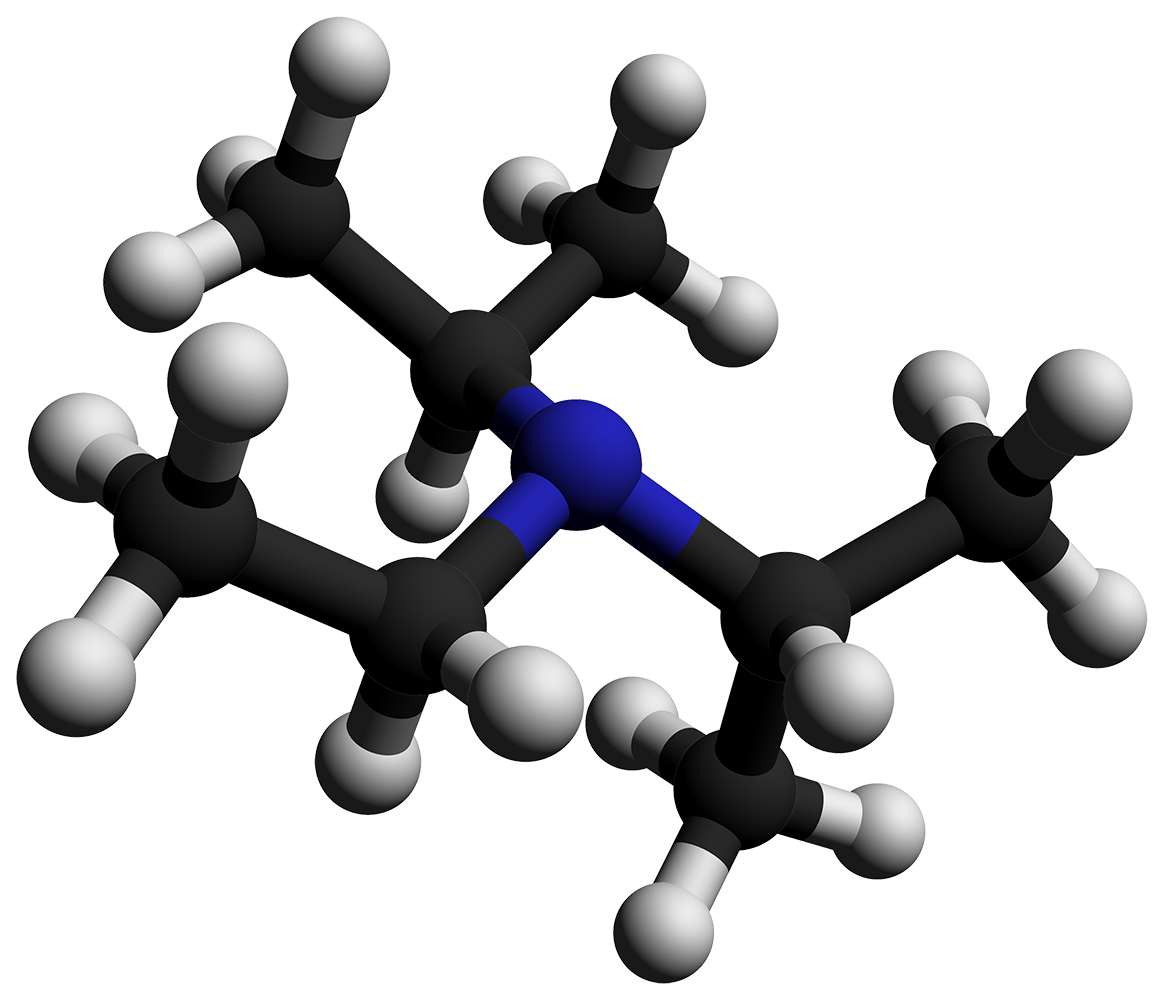

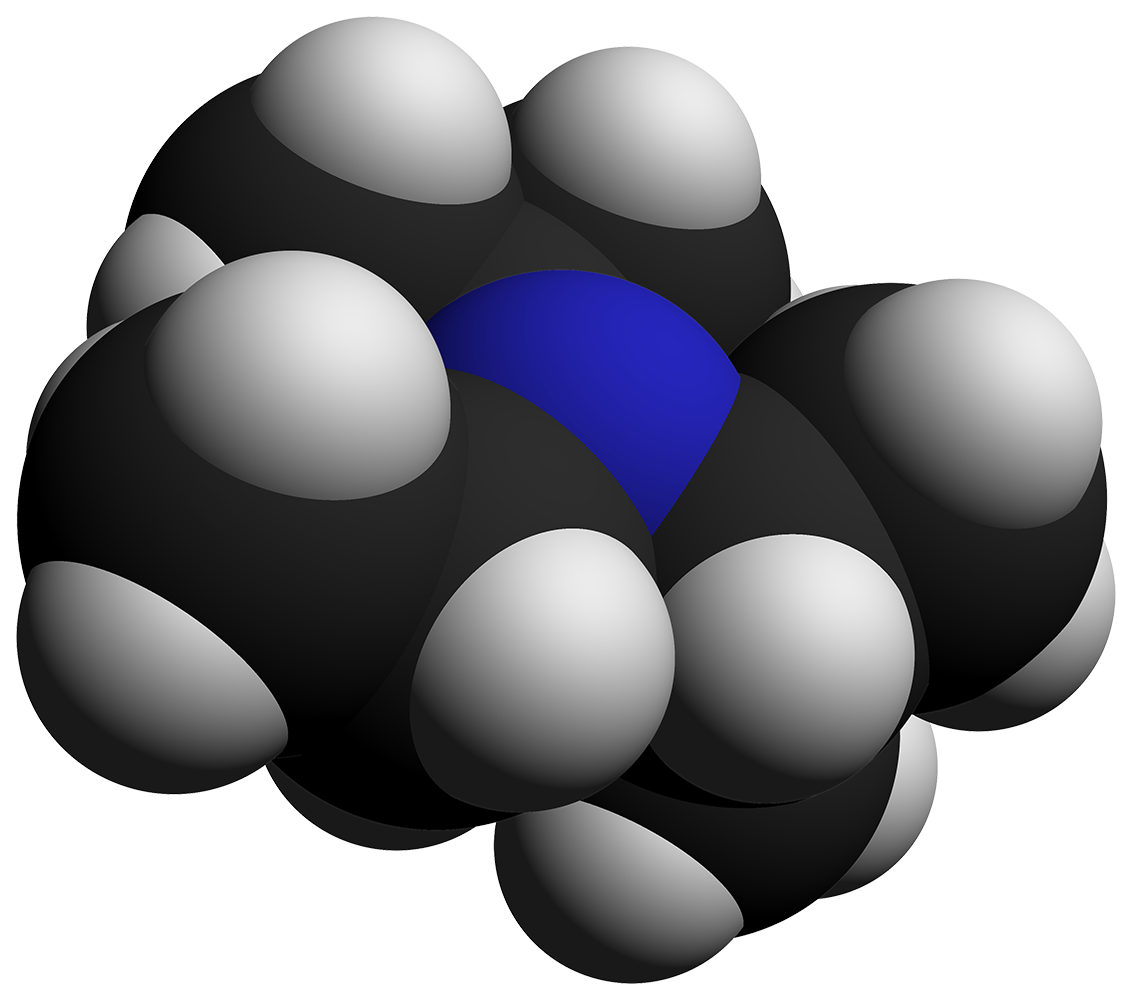

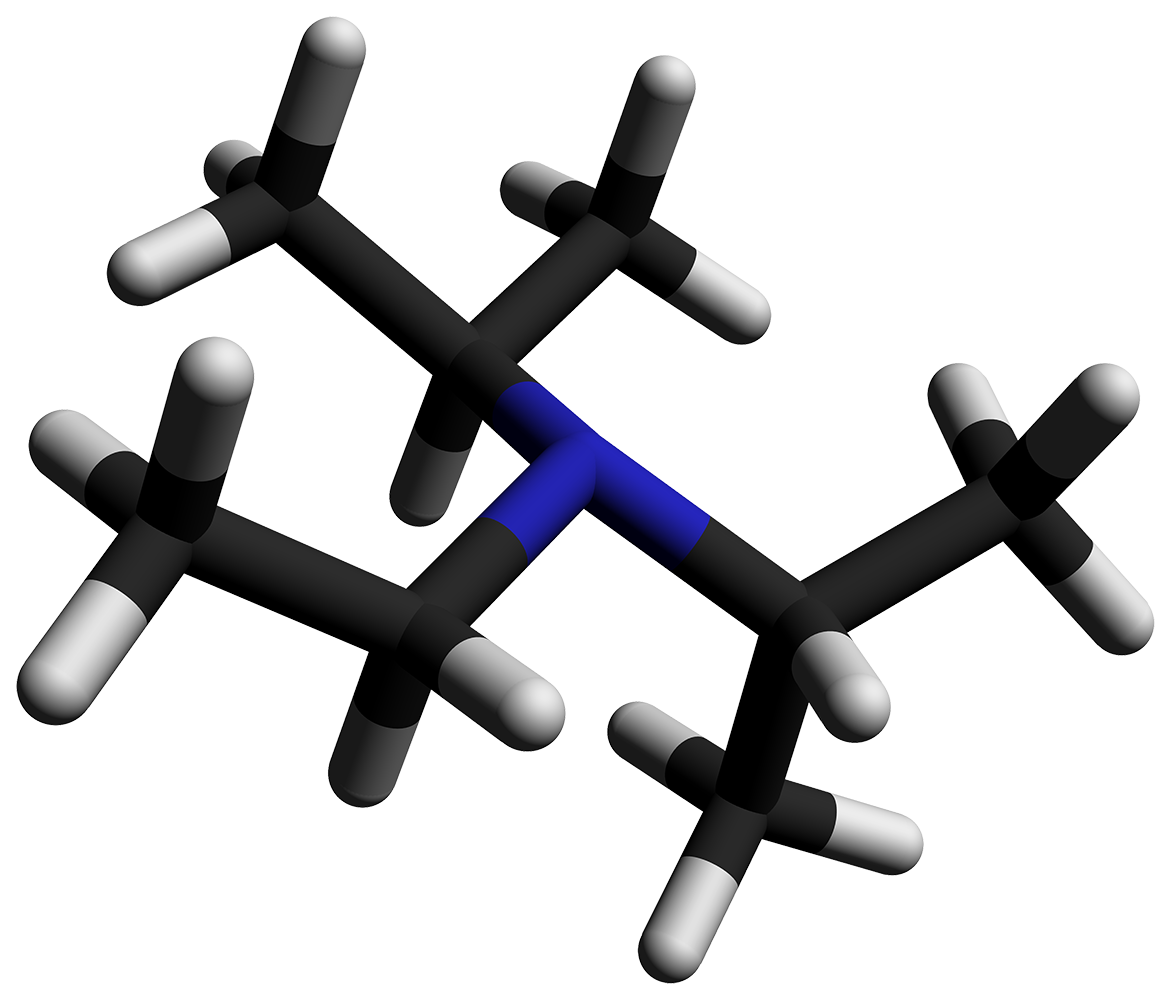

Names
- Preferred IUPAC name N-Ethyl-N-(propan-2-yl)propan-2-amine
- Other names: Ethyldi(propan-2-yl)amine; N-ethyl-N-isopropylpropan-2-amine; Ethyldi(isopropyl)amine; Hünig's base; DIPEA

Identifiers
CAS Number	7087-68-5
3D model (JSmol)	Interactive image
ChemSpider	73565
ECHA InfoCard	100.027.629
EC Number	230-392-0
MeSH	N,N-diisopropylethylamine
PubChem CID	81531
UNII	5SIQ15721L
UN number	2733
CompTox Dashboard (EPA)	DTXSID8064561
- InChI: InChI=1S/C8H19N/c1-6-9(7(2)3)8(4)5/h7-8H,6H2,1-5H3 Key: JGFZNNIVVJXRND-UHFFFAOYSA-N
- SMILES: CCN(C(C)C)C(C)C

Properties
Chemical formula	C_{8}H_{19}N
Molar mass	129.247 g·mol^{−1}
Appearance	Colorless liquid
Odor	Fishy, ammoniacal
Density	0.742 g mL^{−1}
Melting point	−50 to −46 °C (−58 to −51 °F; 223 to 227 K)
Boiling point	126.6 °C; 259.8 °F; 399.7 K
Solubility in water	4.01 g/L (at 20 °C)
Vapor pressure	4.1 kPa (at 37.70 °C)
Refractive index (n_{D})	1.414

Hazards
- GHS labelling
Pictograms	(GHS02: Flammable) (GHS05: Corrosive) (GHS06: Toxic)
Signal word	Danger
Hazard statements	H225, H301, H314, H412
Precautionary statements	P210, P273, P280, P301+P310, P305+P351+P338, P310
Flash point	10 °C (50 °F; 283 K)
Explosive limits	0.7–6.3%
- Lethal dose or concentration (LD, LC)
LD_{50} (median dose)	200–500 mg kg^{−1} (oral, rat)

Related compounds
Related amines	Triethylamine; 2,6-Di-tert-butylpyridine; 1,5-Diazabicyclo(4.3.0)non-5-ene; 1,8-Diazabicycloundec-7-ene
Related compounds	Triisopropylamine
- Except where otherwise noted, data are given for materials in their standard state (at 25 °C [77 °F], 100 kPa). verify (what is ?) Infobox references

N,N-Diisopropylethylamine, or Hünig's base, is an organic compound that is a tertiary amine. It is named after the German chemist Siegfried Hünig. It is used in organic chemistry as a non-nucleophilic base. It is commonly abbreviated as DIPEA, DIEA, or i-Pr_{2}NEt.

== Structure ==
DIPEA consists of a central nitrogen atom that is bonded to an ethyl group and two isopropyl groups. A lone pair of electrons resides on the nitrogen atom, which can react with electrophiles. However, the three alkyl groups on the nitrogen atom create steric hindrance, so only small electrophiles such as protons can react with the nitrogen lone pair.

== Occurrence and preparation ==
DIPEA is commercially available. It is traditionally prepared by the alkylation of diisopropylamine with diethyl sulfate.

Pure DIPEA exists as a colorless liquid, although commercial samples can be slightly yellow. If necessary, the compound can be purified by distillation from potassium hydroxide or calcium hydride.

== Uses and reactions ==
DIPEA is a sterically hindered organic base that is commonly employed as a proton scavenger. Thus, like 2,2,6,6-tetramethylpiperidine and triethylamine, DIPEA is a good base but a poor nucleophile, DIPEA has low solubility in water, which makes it very easily recovered in commercial processes, a combination of properties that makes it a useful organic reagent.

=== Amide coupling ===
It is commonly used as the hindered base in amide coupling reactions between a carboxylic acid (typically activated, for example, as an acid chloride, as illustrated below) and a nucleophilic amine. As DIPEA is hindered and poorly nucleophilic, it does not compete with the nucleophilic amine in the coupling reaction.

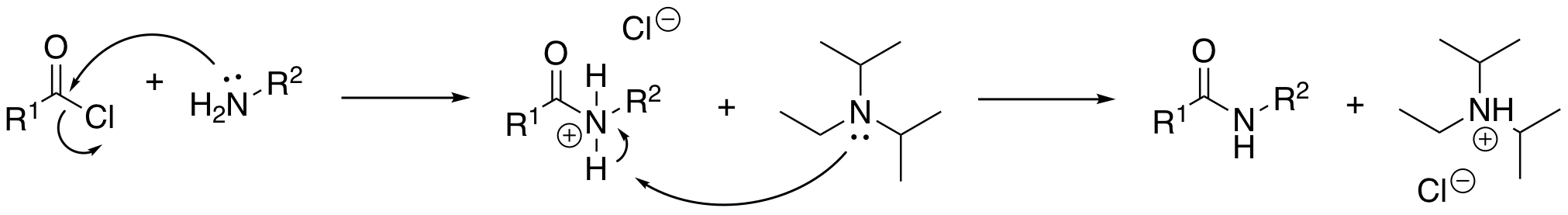

=== Alkylations ===
DIPEA has been investigated for its use as a selective reagent in the alkylation of secondary amines to tertiary amines by alkyl halides. This is often hampered by an unwanted Menshutkin reaction forming a quaternary ammonium salt, but is absent when DIPEA is present.

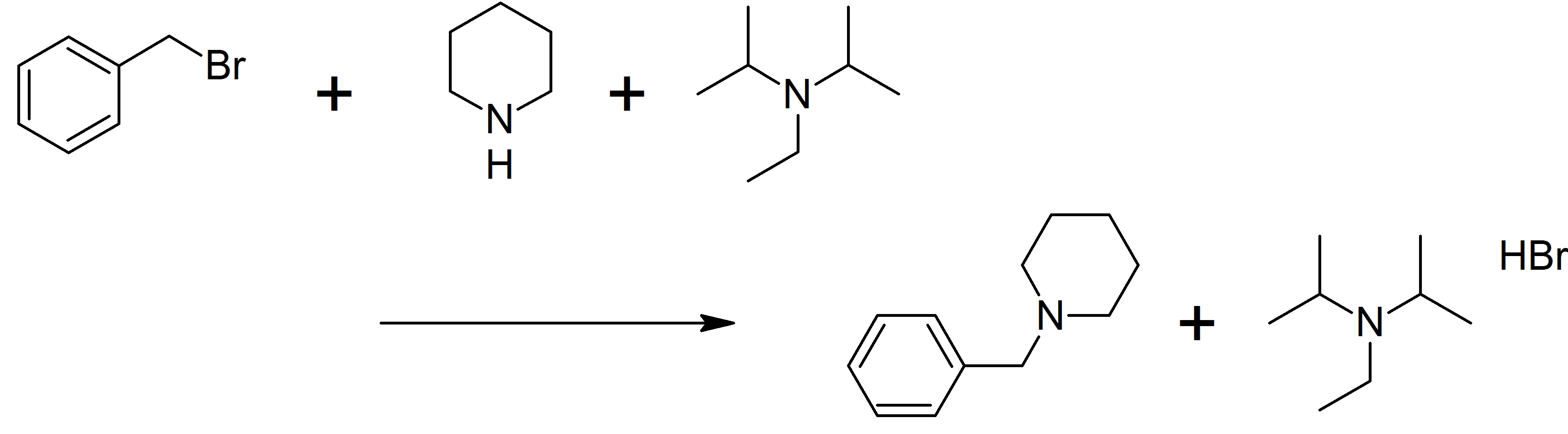

=== Transition metal catalyzed cross-coupling reactions ===
DIPEA can be used as a base in a number of transition metal catalyzed cross-coupling reactions, such as the Heck coupling and the Sonogashira coupling (as illustrated below).

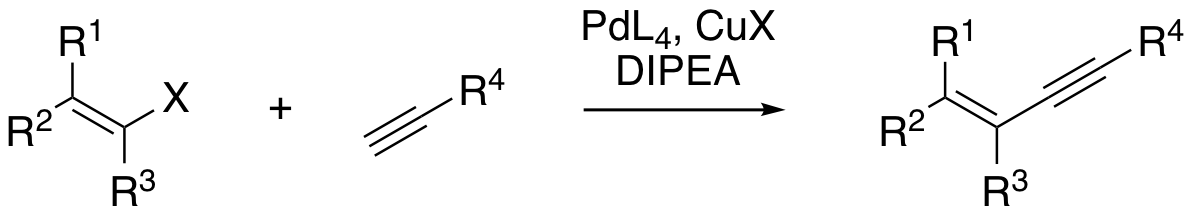

=== Swern oxidation ===
Although triethylamine is traditionally employed as the hindered base in Swern oxidations, the structurally similar DIPEA can be used instead, as exemplified below.

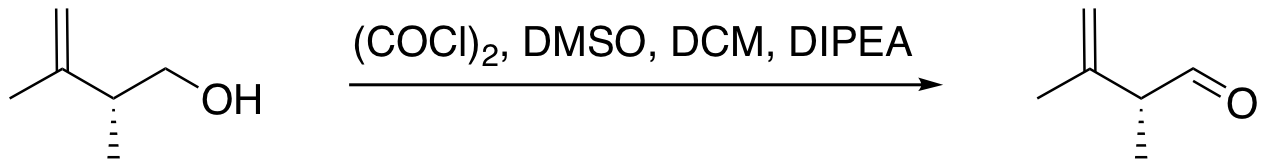

=== Examples of DIPEA used as a substrate ===
DIPEA forms a complex heterocyclic compound called scorpionine (bis([1,2]dithiolo)-[1,4]thiazine) upon reaction with disulfur dichloride that is catalyzed by DABCO in a one-pot synthesis.

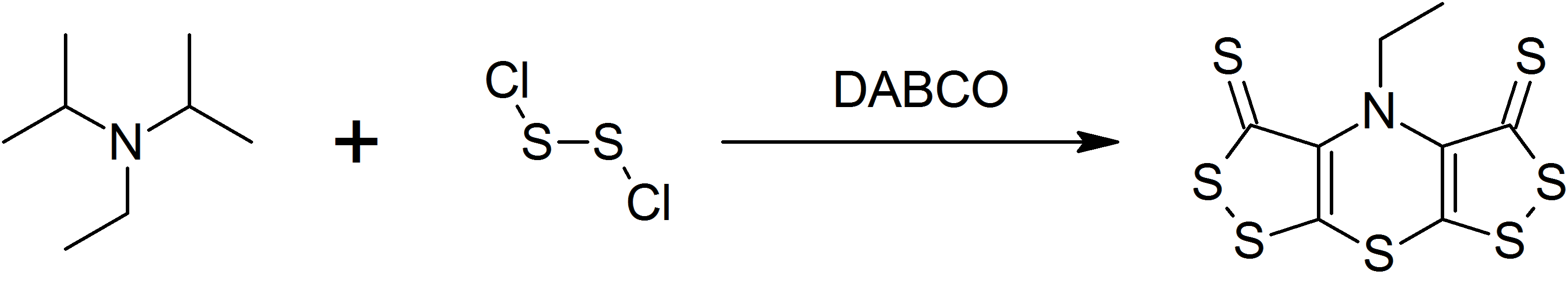

=== Comparison with triethylamine ===
DIPEA and triethylamine are structurally very similar, with both compounds considered hindered organic bases. Due to their structural similarity, DIPEA and triethylamine can be used interchangeably in most applications. The nitrogen atom in DIPEA is more hindered than the nitrogen atom in triethylamine. However, triethylamine is a slightly stronger base than DIPEA; the pK_{a} values of the respective conjugate acids in dimethyl sulfoxide are 9.0 and 8.5, respectively.
