= Dithiobiuret =

- Skeletal formula of dithiobiuret

Names
- Preferred IUPAC name 2-Imido-1,3-dithiodicarbonic diamide

Identifiers
CAS Number	541-53-7
3D model (JSmol)	Interactive image
ChEMBL	ChEMBL501562
ChemSpider	2039482
ECHA InfoCard	100.007.987
EC Number	208-784-8
MeSH	2,4-dithiobiuret
PubChem CID	2758725
RTECS number	EC1575000
UNII	T40X2KXL53
UN number	2811
CompTox Dashboard (EPA)	DTXSID2034968
- InChI: InChI=1S/C2H5N3S2/c3-1(6)5-2(4)7/h(H5,3,4,5,6,7) Key: JIRRNZWTWJGJCT-UHFFFAOYSA-N
- SMILES: NC(=S)NC(N)=S

Properties
Chemical formula	C_{2}H_{5}N_{3}S_{2}
Molar mass	135.20 g·mol^{−1}
Appearance	White crystals
Density	1.54 g/cm^{3}
log P	−0.415
Acidity (pK_{a})	11.152
Basicity (pK_{b})	2.845

Hazards
- GHS labelling
Pictograms	(GHS06: Toxic)
Signal word	Danger
Hazard statements	H300, H310, H330
Precautionary statements	P260, P280, P284, P302+P350, P310

Related compounds
Related compounds	Biuret; Biguanide; Thiourea
- Except where otherwise noted, data are given for materials in their standard state (at 25 °C [77 °F], 100 kPa). Infobox references

Dithiobiuret is an organosulfur compound with the formula HN(C(S)NH_{2})_{2}. It is a colourless solid that is soluble in warm water and polar organic solvents. It is a planar molecule with short C-S and C-N distances (1.69, 1.38 Å, resp.) indicative of multiple C-S and C-N bonding.

The compound can be viewed as the product from the condensation of two molecules of thiourea, but it is prepared by treatment of 2-cyanoguanidine with hydrogen sulfide. The conversion proceeds via guanylthiourea:

NCNC(NH_{2}) + H_{2}S → HN(C(S)NH_{2})(C(NH)NH_{2})
HN(C(S)NH_{2})(C(NH)NH_{2}) + H_{2}S → HN(C(S)NH_{2})_{2}

It is used as a plasticizer, a rubber accelerator, and as an intermediate in pesticide manufacturing.

== Properties ==
Dithiobiuret binds to metals in a bidentate fashion, both as the neutral ligand and as its conjugate base.

== Safety ==
Dithiobiuret is extremely toxic; exposure can result in respiratory failure.

== See also ==
- Biuret
