= Diisopropylamine =

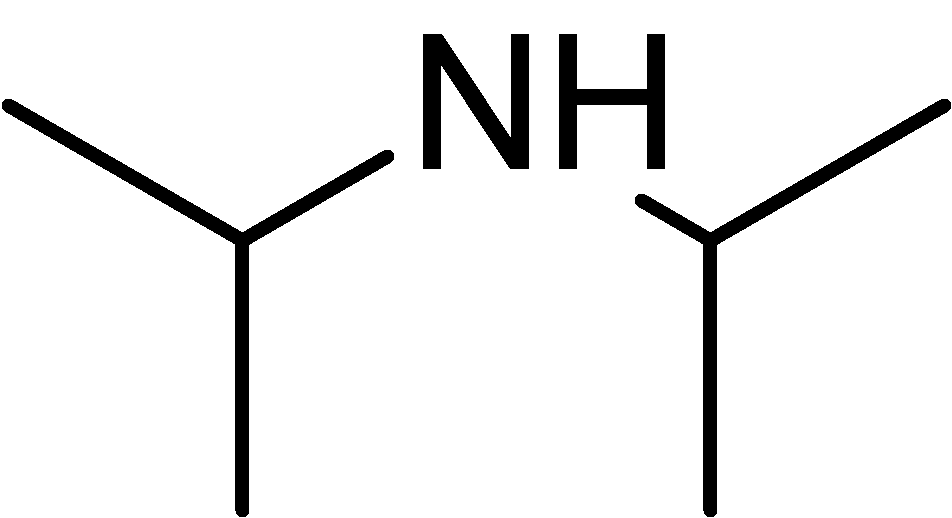
- Skeletal formula of diisopropylamine

Names
- Preferred IUPAC name N-(Propan-2-yl)propan-2-amine
- Other names Di(propan-2-yl)amine; N-Isopropylpropan-2-amine (Diisopropyl)amine (The name diisopropylamine is deprecated.)

Identifiers
CAS Number	108-18-9
3D model (JSmol)	Interactive image
Beilstein Reference	605284
ChemSpider	7624
ECHA InfoCard	100.003.235
EC Number	203-558-5
PubChem CID	7912
RTECS number	IM4025000
UNII	BR9JLI40NO
UN number	1158
CompTox Dashboard (EPA)	DTXSID9025085
- InChI: InChI=1S/C6H15N/c1-5(2)7-6(3)4/h5-7H,1-4H3 Key: UAOMVDZJSHZZME-UHFFFAOYSA-N
- SMILES: CC(C)NC(C)C

Properties
Chemical formula	C_{6}H_{15}N
Molar mass	101.193 g·mol^{−1}
Appearance	Colorless liquid
Odor	Fishy, ammoniacal
Density	0.722 g mL^{−1}
Melting point	−61.00 °C; −77.80 °F; 212.15 K
Boiling point	83 to 85 °C; 181 to 185 °F; 356 to 358 K
Solubility in water	miscible
Vapor pressure	9.3 kPa (at 20°C)
Acidity (pK_{a})	11.07 (in water) (conjugate acid)
Basicity (pK_{b})	3.43
Refractive index (n_{D})	1.392–1.393

Thermochemistry
Std enthalpy of formation (Δ_{f}H^{⦵}_{298})	−173.6 to −168.4 kJ mol^{−1}
Std enthalpy of combustion (Δ_{c}H^{⦵}_{298})	−4.3363 to −4.3313 MJ mol^{−1}

Hazards
- GHS labelling
Pictograms	(GHS02: Flammable) (GHS05: Corrosive) (GHS07: Exclamation mark)
Signal word	Danger
Hazard statements	H225, H302, H314, H332
Precautionary statements	P210, P280, P305+P351+P338, P310
NFPA 704 (fire diamond)	2 3 0
Flash point	−17 °C (1 °F; 256 K)
Autoignition temperature	315 °C (599 °F; 588 K)
Explosive limits	1.1–7.1%
- Lethal dose or concentration (LD, LC)
LD_{50} (median dose)	770 mg kg^{−1} (oral, rat); >10 g kg^{−1} (dermal, rabbit)
LC_{50} (median concentration)	1140 ppm (rat, 2 hr); 1000 ppm (mouse, 2 hr)
LC_{Lo} (lowest published)	2207 ppm (rabbit, 2.5 hr); 2207 ppm (guinea pig, 80 min); 2207 ppm (cat, 72 min)
- NIOSH (US health exposure limits)
PEL (Permissible)	TWA 5 ppm (20 mg/m^{3}) [skin]
REL (Recommended)	TWA 5 ppm (20 mg/m^{3}) [skin]
IDLH (Immediate danger)	200 ppm

Related compounds
Related amines	Dimethylamine; Diethylamine
Related compounds	Triisopropylamine; N,N-Diisopropylethylamine
- Except where otherwise noted, data are given for materials in their standard state (at 25 °C [77 °F], 100 kPa). verify (what is ?) Infobox references

Diisopropylamine is a secondary amine with the chemical formula (Me_{2}CH)_{2}NH (Me = methyl). Diisopropylamine is a colorless liquid with an ammonia-like odor. Its lithium derivative, lithium diisopropylamide, known as LDA is a widely used reagent.

== Reactions and use ==
Diisopropylamine is a common amine nucleophile in organic synthesis. Because it is bulky, it is a more selective nucleophile than other similar amines, such as dimethylamine.

It reacts with organolithium reagents to give lithium diisopropylamide (LDA). LDA is a strong, non-nucleophilic base.

The main commercial applications of diisopropylamine is as a precursor to the herbicide, diallate and triallate as well as certain sulfenamides used in the vulcanization of rubber.

It is also used to prepare N,N-diisopropylethylamine (Hünig's base) by alkylation with diethyl sulfate.

The bromide salt of diisopropylamine, diisopropylammonium bromide, is a room-temperature organic ferroelectric material.

== Preparation ==
Diisopropylamine, which is commercially available, may be prepared by the reductive amination of acetone with ammonia using a modified copper oxide, generally copper chromite, as a catalyst:

NH_{3} + 2 (CH_{3})_{2}CO + 2 H_{2} → C_{6}H_{15}N + 2 H_{2}O

Diisopropylamine can be dried by distillation from potassium hydroxide (KOH) or drying over sodium wire.

== Toxicity ==
Diisopropylamine causes burns by all exposure routes. Inhalation of high concentrations of its vapor may cause symptoms like headache, dizziness, tiredness, nausea and vomiting.
