= HN1 (nitrogen mustard) =

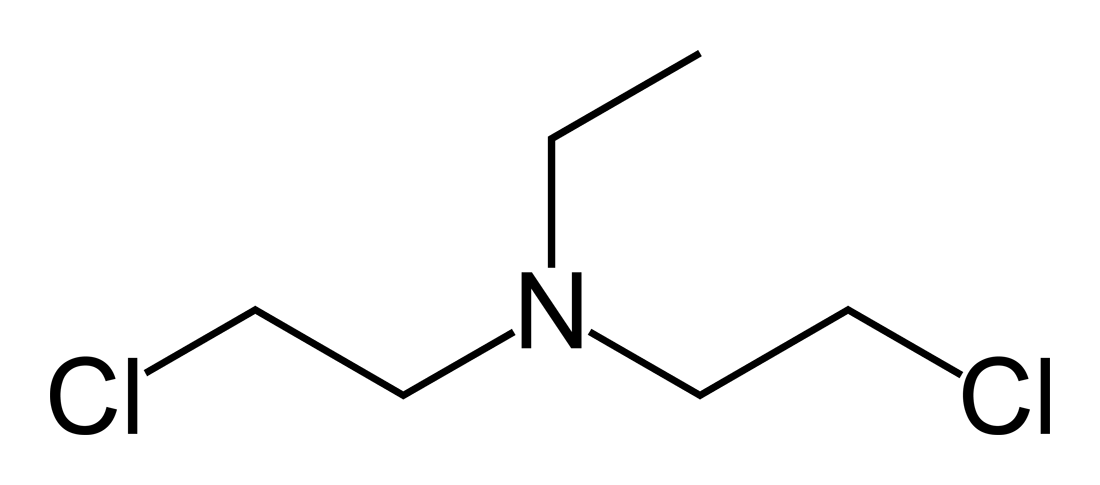
- Skeletal formula of HN1 (nitrogen mustard)

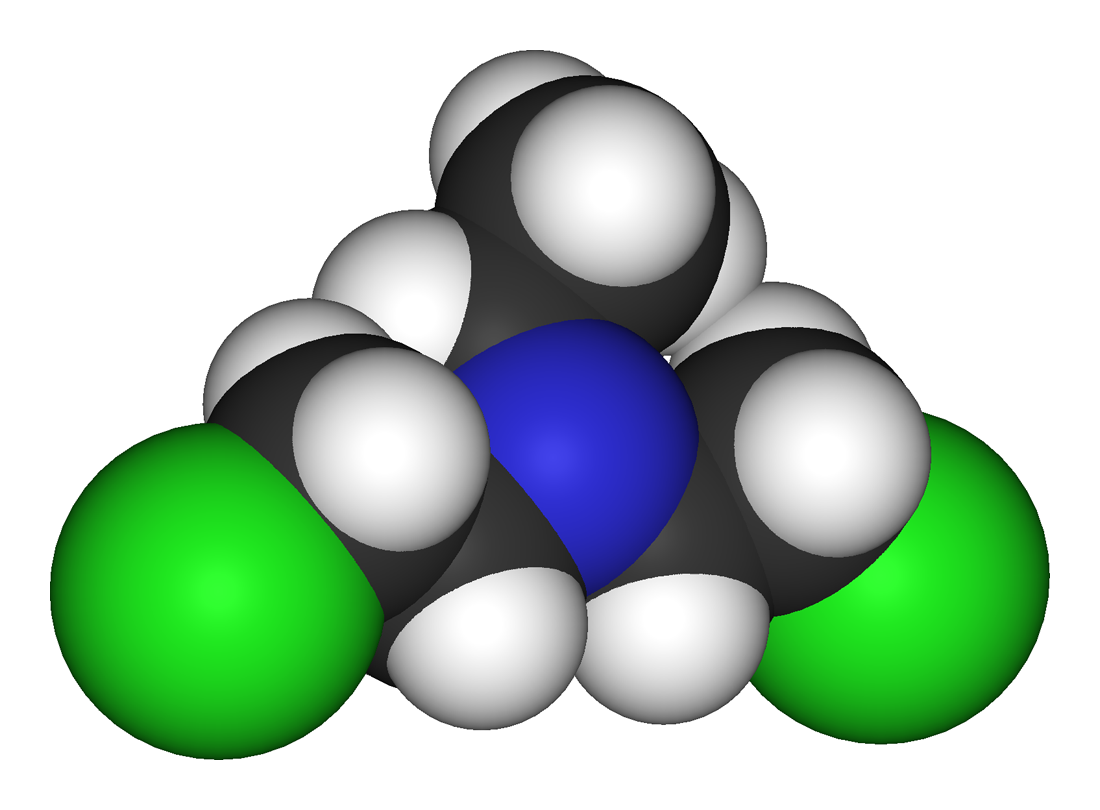
- Spacefill model of HN1 (nitrogen mustard)

Names
- IUPAC name 2-Chloro-N-(2-chloroethyl)-N-ethylethanamine
- Other names Bis(2-chloroethyl)(ethyl)amine

Identifiers
CAS Number	538-07-8
3D model (JSmol)	Interactive image
ChemSpider	10391
MeSH	bis(2-chloroethyl)ethylamine
PubChem CID	10848
RTECS number	YE1225000
UNII	B75ZZA7WIG
UN number	2810
CompTox Dashboard (EPA)	DTXSID0060220
- InChI: InChI=1S/C6H13Cl2N/c1-2-9(5-3-7)6-4-8/h2-6H2,1H3 Key: UQZPGHOJMQTOHB-UHFFFAOYSA-N
- SMILES: CCN(CCCl)CCCl

Properties
Chemical formula	C_{6}H_{13}Cl_{2}N
Molar mass	170.08 g·mol^{−1}
Appearance	Colourless to pale yellow oily liquid
Odor	Fishy, musty
Density	1.0861 g mL^{−1} (at 20 °C)
Melting point	−34 °C (−29 °F; 239 K)
Boiling point	85.5 °C (185.9 °F; 358.6 K)

Related compounds
Related compounds	Chlormethine (HN2) Tris(2-chloroethylamine) Sulfur mustard Bis(chloroethyl) ether Tris(2-aminoethyl)amine Diethanolamine
- Except where otherwise noted, data are given for materials in their standard state (at 25 °C [77 °F], 100 kPa). Infobox references

Bis(2-chloroethyl)ethylamine is the organic compound with the formula C_{2}H_{5}N(CH_{2}CH_{2}Cl)_{2}. Often abbreviated HN1, it is a powerful vesicant and a nitrogen mustard gas. HN1 was developed in the 1920s and 1930s to remove warts and later as a military agent. Because of the latter use, it is a Schedule 1 chemical within the Chemical Weapons Convention and therefore use and production is strongly restricted.

Like other nitrogen mustards, HN1 is an oily liquid with a faint fishy or musty odor. Commercial samples often appear yellowish, but the compound is colorless. HN1 is also an alkylating agent. In terms of its salient biological activity, HN1 is an alkylating agent and DNA crosslinker.

== Reactions ==
Nitrogen mustards react via an initial cyclization to the corresponding aziridinium salt. The rate of this reaction is pH dependent because the protonated amine cannot cyclize. The aziridinium ion reacts with water in a slower reaction. At pH 8, the nitrogen mustards are essentially quantitatively converted to the aziridinium ion for subsequent slow reaction with water. In contrast, at pH 4 cyclization and hydrolysis show the classic form of reactions in series. Hydrolysis of HN1 produces toxic intermediates.

HN1 reacts with iron alloys, corroding them at and above 65 °C (149 °F), and reacts with metals in general, producing hydrogen gas. This can potentially cause explosions.

== Toxicity ==
Because HN1 is an alkylating agent, it damages DNA, causes immunosuppression, and causes injury to areas that come into contact with it. Exposure to HN1 can be fatal, and its effects on skin and mucous membranes are worsened when they are moist. The alkylation effects cause damage to the spleen, bone marrow, and lymph nodes, which causes anemia, low white cell counts, and internal bleeding. The vesicant effects cause blistering and damage to the skin.

The symptoms of exposure depend on the route of exposure. Eye exposure to vapor can cause lacrimation (tears), blepharospasm (eyelid twitching), irritation, itching, burning pain, dry feeling, and sometimes miosis (pinpoint pupils). More severe vapor exposure can also cause swelling and fluid buildup (edema) in the eyelids, increased pain, and redness. Very severe exposure to vapor or exposure to liquid can cause photophobia (aversion to light), corneal ulceration, and blindness.

Inhaling the vapor causes symptoms that begin in the upper airway and expand to the lower airway. Increased concentrations cause worse symptoms. Mild inhalation exposure causes rhinorrhea (runny nose), sneezing, barking cough (a harsh cough that sounds somewhat like a dog barking), epistaxis (nosebleed), dyspnea (shortness of breath) that affects smokers and asthmatics, hoarseness that turns into toneless voice, ageusia (loss of taste), and anosmia (loss of smell); later on, sinus and nose pain develops. With more severe inhalation exposure, the airway becomes inflamed, pneumonia develops, and the respiratory epithelium can begin to have necrosis and slough off, forming a pseudomembrane that can occlude the airway. This occlusion can be fatal, as can the pneumonia.

Skin contact with nitrogen mustard in low concentrations causes symptoms beginning with redness, then moving to blistering, itching, and burning pain. More severe exposure can cause necrosis (cell death) in the blisters, and systemic toxicity, which causes malaise, vomiting, exhaustion, and fever. Skin exposure that causes symptoms over more than 25% of the body area is often fatal. Though ingestion is uncommon, nitrogen mustard can burn the GI tract and cause nausea, vomiting, hemorrhagic diarrhea, and abdominal pain.

Nitrogen mustard exposure does not cause symptoms until several hours to several days afterwards, but more severe exposure causes symptoms sooner. With severe exposure, eye injury can manifest within 1-2 hours, airway damage within 2-6 hours, and skin damage within 6-12 hours (sooner in hot or humid weather). Mild exposure takes longer to manifest symptoms: eye injury within 3-12 hours, airway damage within 12-24 hours, and skin damage up to 48 hours post-exposure.

=== Long-term sequelae ===
Effects of nitrogen mustard exposure can be long-term or permanent; it is also a known carcinogen, reprotoxin, and developmental toxin after chronic and acute exposure, causing skin cancer and airway cancers in particular. Blindness from an acute exposure is usually temporary, resolving in days to months depending on severity. Chronic respiratory and eye infections are also common after acute nitrogen mustard exposure. Other consequences of acute exposure include ageusia, anosmia, pulmonary fibrosis, scarring, bronchitis, chronic respiratory disease, mental illness, and central nervous system damage. Consequences of chronic exposure beyond cancer include permanent kidney damage and immunosuppression.

== Treatment ==
Treatment for HN1 exposure is primarily supportive, since there is no antidote. First aid involves decontamination, irrigation, removing the affected person from the source of exposure, immediate medical attention, airway management (in cases of inhalation exposure), and medical monitoring of respiratory and cardiac function. If the affected person has trouble breathing (dyspnea) or stops breathing (apnea), ventilatory support and oxygen therapy can be helpful. If HN1 has been ingested, emetics (agents that induce vomiting) and gastric lavage are contraindicated, and nothing should be consumed by mouth because they could damage the gastrointestinal system.

== See also ==
- Nitrogen mustard
