= C4H11N =

The molecular formula C_{4}H_{11}N may refer to:

- Butylamines:
  - n-Butylamine
  - sec-Butylamine
  - tert-Butylamine
  - Isobutylamine
- Diethylamine
- N,N-Dimethylethylamine
