= Butylamine =

Butylamines are several related chemical compounds:

- n-Butylamine
- sec-Butylamine
- tert-Butylamine
- Isobutylamine
