= Aminopropane =

Aminopropane may refer to:

- Propylamine (1-aminopropane)
- Isopropylamine (2-aminopropane)
