= Methylpropylamine =

Methylpropylamine may refer to:

- sec-Butylamine (1-methylpropylamine)
- tert-Butylamine (2-methyl-2-propylamine)
- N-Methylpropylamine
