= MPAO =

MPAO may refer to:

- Polyamine oxidase (propane-1,3-diamine-forming), an enzyme
- N1-acetylpolyamine oxidase, an enzyme
- Metallocene Polyalphaolefin (mPAO) an advanced synthetic base lubricant oil
