= C3H10N2 =

The molecular formula C_{3}H_{10}N_{2} (molar mass: 74.12 g/mol, exact mass: 74.08440 u) may refer to:

- 1,2-Diaminopropane (propane-1,2-diamine)
- 1,3-Diaminopropane
