= 2-Methyl-2-nitrosopropane =

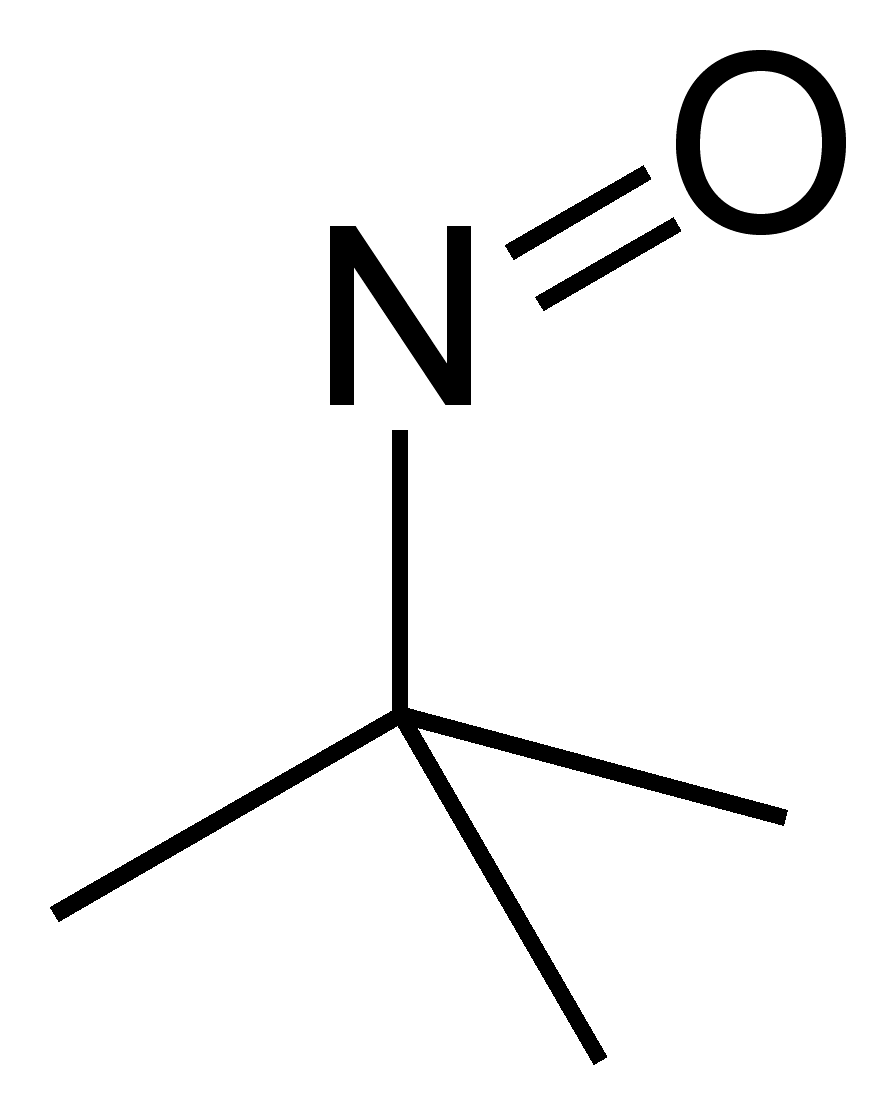
- Skeletal formula of 2-methyl-2-nitrosopropane

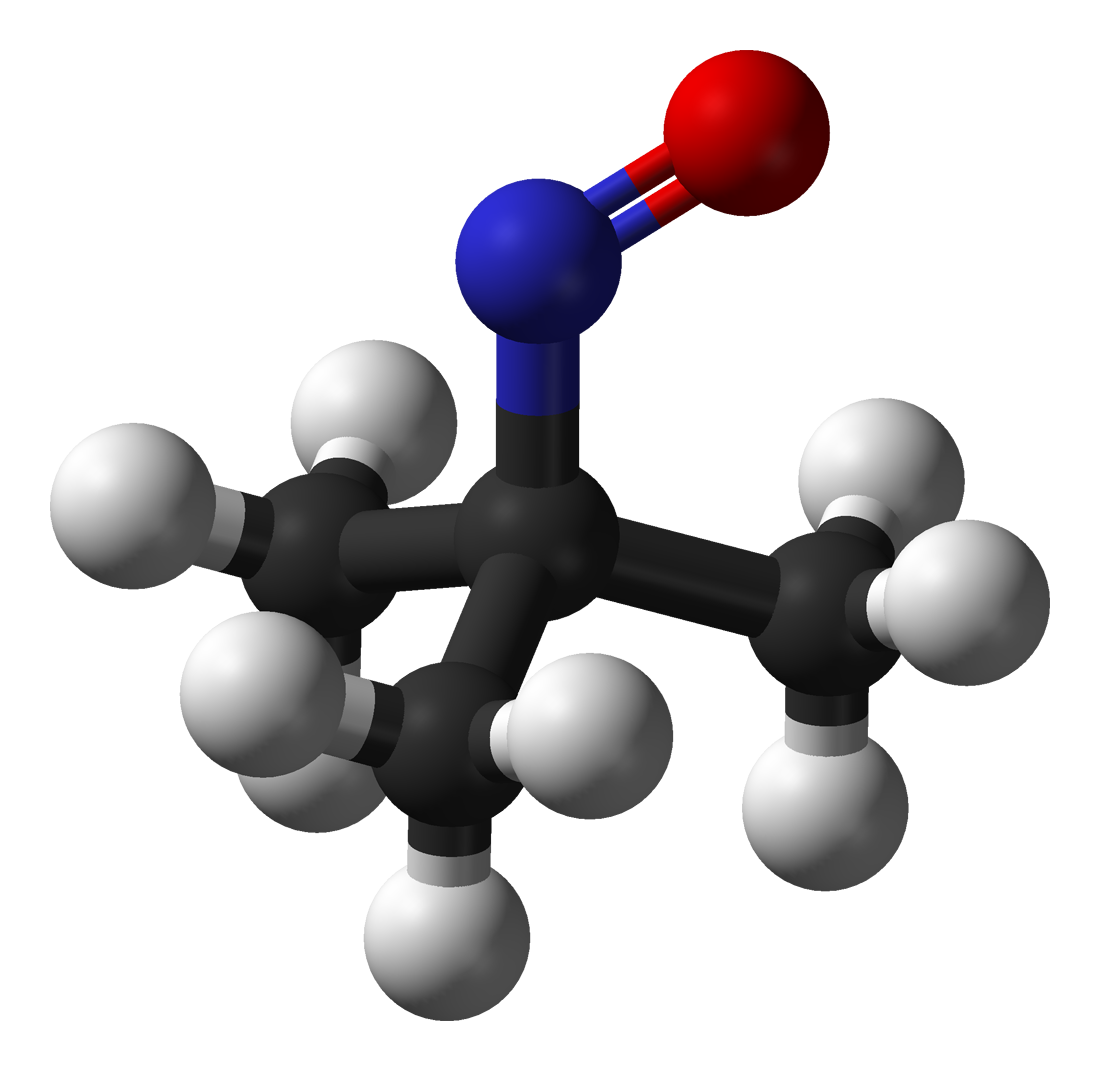
- Ball and stick model of 2-methyl-2-nitrosopropane

Names
- Preferred IUPAC name 2-Methyl-2-nitrosopropane
- Other names tert-Nitrosobutane

Identifiers
CAS Number	917-95-3
3D model (JSmol)	Interactive image
Abbreviations	MNP
ChemSpider	21764
MeSH	tert-nitrosobutane
PubChem CID	23272
UNII	JGX6N17V2U
CompTox Dashboard (EPA)	DTXSID80878749
- InChI: InChI=1S/C4H9NO/c1-4(2,3)5-6/h1-3H3 Key: LUQZKEZPFQRRRK-UHFFFAOYSA-N
- SMILES: CC(C)(C)N=O

Properties
Chemical formula	C_{4}H_{9}NO
Molar mass	87.122 g·mol^{−1}
Appearance	Blue liquid

Related compounds
Related compounds	Ethylamine; Ethylenediamine; Propylamine; Isopropylamine; 1,2-Diaminopropane; 1,3-Diaminopropane; Isobutylamine; tert-Butylamine; n-Butylamine; sec-Butylamine; Putrescine
- Except where otherwise noted, data are given for materials in their standard state (at 25 °C [77 °F], 100 kPa). verify (what is ?) Infobox references

2-Methyl-2-nitrosopropane (MNP or t-nitrosobutane) is the organic compound with the formula (CH_{3})_{3}CNO. It is a blue liquid that is used in chemical research as a spin trap, i.e. it binds to radicals.

== Preparation and structure ==
Many strong oxidants convert tert-butylamine to the nitroso compound, but none do so in high yield. Consequently, t-BuNO is prepared by the following "oscillatory redox" sequence:

(CH_{3})_{3}CNH_{2} → (CH_{3})_{3}CNO_{2}
(CH_{3})_{3}CNO_{2} → (CH_{3})_{3}CNHOH
(CH_{3})_{3}CNHOH → (CH_{3})_{3}CNO

The freshly distilled compound is a blue volatile liquid. Like other nitroso compounds, it features a bent C-N=O linkage. Upon standing at room temperature, the blue liquid converts to the colourless solid that is the dimer (m.p. 74-75 °C). In solution, this dimer quickly reverts to the blue monomer.

== Reactions ==
It can be used as a spin trap. This molecule traps unstable free radicals to form stable paramagnetic nitroxide radicals that can be detected and analyzed by electron spin resonance spectroscopy. It is particularly useful for trapping carbon-centered tyrosyl radicals. It has also been used in organic chemistry as electrophile to transform sulfones into aldehydes.

MNP is also an efficient regulator of the radical polymerization of methyl methacrylate through the 'pseudoliving' chain mechanism.

== See also ==
- Nitroso
