= Salpn ligand =

Names
- IUPAC name 2,2'-{1,2-Propanediylbis[nitrilo(E)methylylidene]}diphenol

Identifiers
CAS Number	94-91-7
3D model (JSmol)	Interactive image
ChEMBL	ChEMBL3185057
ChemSpider	10296917
ECHA InfoCard	100.002.159
EC Number	202-374-2
PubChem CID	7210
UNII	7S023Y0W20
CompTox Dashboard (EPA)	DTXSID2041200
- InChI: InChI=1S/C17H18N2O2/c1-13(19-12-15-7-3-5-9-17(15)21)10-18-11-14-6-2-4-8-16(14)20/h2-9,11-13,20-21H,10H2,1H3/b18-11+,19-12+ Key: RURPJGZXBHYNEM-GDAWTGGTSA-N
- SMILES: OC1=CC=CC=C1/C=N/CC(C)/N=C/C2=CC=CC=C2O

Properties
Chemical formula	C_{17}H_{18}N_{2}O_{2}
Molar mass	282.343 g·mol^{−1}

Hazards
- GHS labelling
Pictograms	(GHS05: Corrosive) (GHS07: Exclamation mark) (GHS08: Health hazard) (GHS09: Environmental hazard)
Signal word	Warning
Hazard statements	H226, H302, H315, H317, H319, H360, H411, H412
Precautionary statements	P201, P202, P210, P233, P240, P241, P242, P243, P261, P264, P270, P272, P273, P280, P281, P301+P312, P302+P352, P303+P361+P353, P305+P351+P338, P308+P313, P321, P330, P332+P313, P333+P313, P337+P313, P362, P363, P370+P378, P391, P403+P235, P405, P501
- Except where otherwise noted, data are given for materials in their standard state (at 25 °C [77 °F], 100 kPa). (what is ?) Infobox references

Salpn is the common name for a chelating ligand, properly called N,N′-bis(salicylidene)-1,2-propanediamine, used as a motor oil additive.

The molecular structure of pure (metal-free) salpn, sometimes denoted H_{2}(salpn) or salpnH_{2}, can be described as the salen ligand with a methyl group attached to the ethylene bridge that links the two nitrogen atoms.

As in the case of salen compound, the actual ligand is usually the conjugate base salpn^{2-}, the divalent anion that result from the metal-free compound by the loss of two hydroxyl protons. This dianion is commonly denoted "(salpn)" in formulas of metal complexes.

The abbreviation "salpn" is also sometimes used for the structural isomer N,N′-bis(salicylidene)-1,3-diaminopropane and its conjugate base, derived from 1,3-diaminopropane rather than 1,2-diaminopropane.

== Preparation ==
The synthesis of salpn is achieved by a condensation reaction of 1,2-diaminopropane with salicylaldehyde:

2C_{6}H_{4}(OH)CHO + CH_{3}CH(NH_{2})CH_{2}NH_{2} → [C_{6}H_{4}(OH)CH]_{2}CH_{3}CHNCH_{2}N + 2H_{2}O

== Uses ==
Salpn is used as a fuel additive as a metal deactivator in motor oils. Trace metals degrade the fuels by catalyzing oxidation processes that lead to gums and solids. Metal deactivators like salpn form stable coordination compounds with the metals, suppressing their catalytic activity. While salpn forms stable chelate complexes with many metals including copper, iron, chromium, and nickel, it is the coordination with copper that makes it a popular choice as a fuel additive. Copper has the highest catalytic activity in fuel, and salpn forms a highly stable square planar complex with the metal.

Salpn is preferred over salen, possibly because it has higher solubility in non-polar liquids.
