= 1,2-Diaminopropane =

- Skeletal formula of 1,2-diaminopropane with some implicit hydrogens shown

Names
- Preferred IUPAC name Propane-1,2-diamine
- Other names 1,2-Propanediamine

Identifiers
CAS Number	78-90-0
3D model (JSmol)	Interactive image
Beilstein Reference	605274
ChEBI	CHEBI:30630
ChemSpider	13849260; 394801 R; 557530 S
ECHA InfoCard	100.001.051
EC Number	201-155-9
Gmelin Reference	25709
MeSH	1,2-diaminopropane
PubChem CID	6567; 447820 R; 642322 S
RTECS number	TX6650000
UNII	2A4P522UGO
UN number	2258
CompTox Dashboard (EPA)	DTXSID4021761
- InChI: InChI=1S/C3H10N2/c1-3(5)2-4/h3H,2,4-5H2,1H3 Key: dAOHJOMMDDJHIJH-UHFFFAOYSA-N
- SMILES: CC(N)CN

Properties
Chemical formula	C_{3}H_{10}N_{2}
Molar mass	74.127 g·mol^{−1}
Appearance	Colourless liquid
Odor	Fishy, ammoniacal
Density	870 mg mL^{−1}
Melting point	−37.1 °C; −34.9 °F; 236.0 K
Boiling point	119.6 °C; 247.2 °F; 392.7 K
Vapor pressure	1.9 kPa (at 20 °C)
Magnetic susceptibility (χ)	−58.1·10^{−6} cm^{3}/mol
Refractive index (n_{D})	1.446

Thermochemistry
Heat capacity (C)	205.64 J K^{−1} mol^{−1}
Std molar entropy (S^{⦵}_{298})	247.27 J K^{−1} mol^{−1}
Std enthalpy of formation (Δ_{f}H^{⦵}_{298})	−98.2 – −97.4 kJ mol^{−1}
Std enthalpy of combustion (Δ_{c}H^{⦵}_{298})	−2.5122 – −2.5116 MJ mol^{−1}

Hazards
- GHS labelling
Pictograms	(GHS02: Flammable) (GHS05: Corrosive) (GHS07: Exclamation mark)
Signal word	Danger
Hazard statements	H226, H302, H312, H314
Precautionary statements	P280, P305+P351+P338, P310
Flash point	34 °C (93 °F; 307 K)
Autoignition temperature	360 °C (680 °F; 633 K)
Explosive limits	1.9–11.1%
- Lethal dose or concentration (LD, LC)
LD_{50} (median dose)	434 mg kg^{−1} (dermal, rabbit); 2.23 g kg^{−1} (oral, rat)

Related compounds
Related alkanamines	Ethylamine; Ethylenediamine; Propylamine; Isopropylamine; 1,3-Diaminopropane; Isobutylamine; tert-Butylamine; n-Butylamine; sec-Butylamine; Putrescine
Related compounds	2-Methyl-2-nitrosopropane
- Except where otherwise noted, data are given for materials in their standard state (at 25 °C [77 °F], 100 kPa). verify (what is ?) Infobox references

1,2-Diaminopropane (propane-1,2-diamine) is organic compound with the formula CH_{3}CH(NH_{2})CH_{2}NH_{2}. A colorless liquid, it is the simplest chiral diamine.

== Preparation ==
Industrially, this compound is synthesized by the ammonolysis of 1,2-dichloropropane:

CH_{3}CHClCH_{2}Cl + 4 NH_{3} → CH_{3}CH(NH_{2})CH_{2}NH_{2} + 2 NH_{4}Cl

This preparation allows for the use of waste chloro-organic compounds to form useful amines using inexpensive and readily available ammonia.

The racemic mixture of this chiral compound may be separated into enantiomers by conversion into the diastereomeric tartaric acid ammonium salt. After purification of the diastereomer, the diamine can be regenerated by treatment of the ammonium salt with sodium hydroxide. Alternate reagents for chiral resolution include N-p-toluenesulfonylaspartic acid, N-benzenesulfonylaspartic acid, or N-benzoylglutamic acid.

== Uses ==
1,2-Diaminopropane is used in the synthesis of N,N′-disalicylidene-1,2-propanediamine, a salen-type ligand, usually abbreviated as salpn, that is used as a metal deactivating additive in motor oils.

== Related compounds and derivatives ==
1,2-Diaminopropane forms coordination complexes similar to tris(ethylenediamine)cobalt(III). Owing to the presence of the methyl groups, [Co(pn)_{3}]^{3+} can exist as 24 stereoisomers.

Two chiral 1,2-diamines are 1,2-diaminocyclohexane and 2,3-diaminobutane. The chiral diastereomers of those diamines are C_{2}-symmetric.
