= C2H7N =

The molecular formula C_{2}H_{7}N (molar mass: 45.07 g/mol, exact mass: 45.0579 u) may refer to:

- Ethylamine (ethanamine)
- Dimethylamine (N,N-dimethylamine)
