= HPAO =

HPAO may refer to:

- AOC3, Amine oxidase, copper containing 3 (vascular adhesion protein 1)
- N1-acetylpolyamine oxidase, an enzyme
