= Putrescine N-hydroxycinnamoyltransferase =

Class of enzymes

putrescine N-hydroxycinnamoyltransferase

Identifiers
- EC no.: 2.3.1.138
- CAS no.: 120598-69-8

Databases
- IntEnz: IntEnz view
- BRENDA: BRENDA entry
- ExPASy: NiceZyme view
- KEGG: KEGG entry
- MetaCyc: metabolic pathway
- PRIAM: profile
- PDB structures: RCSB PDB PDBe PDBsum
- Gene Ontology: AmiGO / QuickGO
Search
- PMC: articles
- PubMed: articles
- NCBI: proteins

In enzymology, a putrescine N-hydroxycinnamoyltransferase (EC 2.3.1.138) is an enzyme that catalyzes the chemical reaction

caffeoyl-CoA + putrescine $\rightleftharpoons$ CoA + N-caffeoylputrescine

Thus, the two substrates of this enzyme are caffeoyl-CoA and putrescine, whereas its two products are CoA and N-caffeoylputrescine.

This enzyme belongs to the family of transferases, specifically those acyltransferases transferring groups other than aminoacyl groups. The systematic name of this enzyme class is caffeoyl-CoA:putrescine N-(3,4-dihydroxycinnamoyl)transferase. Other names in common use include caffeoyl-CoA putrescine N-caffeoyl transferase, PHT, putrescine hydroxycinnamoyl transferase, hydroxycinnamoyl-CoA:putrescine hydroxycinnamoyltransferase, and putrescine hydroxycinnamoyltransferase.
