= AZIN1 =

Protein-coding gene in the species Homo sapiens

Identifiers
- Aliases: AZIN1, AZI, AZIA1, OAZI, OAZIN, ODC1L, antizyme inhibitor 1, AZI1
- External IDs: OMIM: 607909; MGI: 1859169; GeneCards: AZIN1
Available structures
PDB	Ortholog search: PDBe RCSB
PDB	List of PDB id codes 4ZGZ

Gene location (Human)
Chr.	Chromosome 8 (human)
Band	8q22.3	Start	102,826,111 bp
Band	8q22.3	End	102,893,864 bp

Gene location (Mouse)
Chr.	Chromosome 15 (mouse)
Band	15|15 B3.1	Start	38,487,671 bp
Band	15|15 B3.1	End	38,519,510 bp
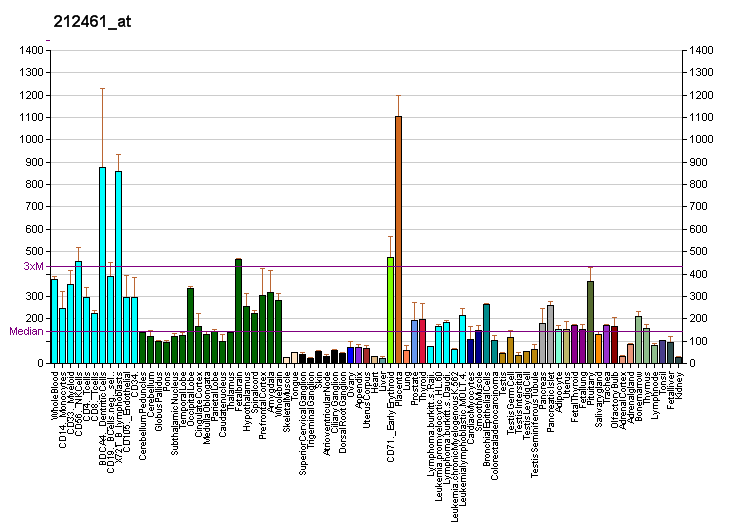

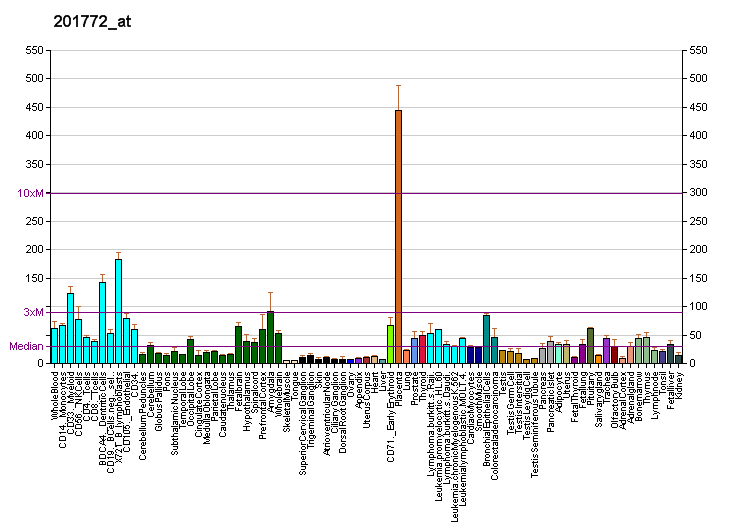
RNA expression pattern
Bgee	Human / Mouse (ortholog); Top expressed in: bronchial epithelial cell; ventricular zone; epithelium of nasopharynx; ganglionic eminence; epithelium of colon; cartilage tissue; placenta; bone marrow cell; jejunal mucosa; body of pancreas / Top expressed in: fetal liver hematopoietic progenitor cell; atrioventricular valve; barrel cortex; spermatocyte; decidua; lacrimal gland; atrium; epithelium of lens; spermatid; salivary gland; More reference expression data
BioGPS	More reference expression data
Gene ontology
Molecular function	ornithine decarboxylase activator activity; protein binding; catalytic activity; ornithine decarboxylase activity
Cellular component	cytosol; nucleus; cytoplasm
Biological process	polyamine biosynthetic process; positive regulation of polyamine transmembrane transport; regulation of cellular amino acid metabolic process; putrescine biosynthetic process from ornithine; positive regulation of catalytic activity; negative regulation of protein catabolic process
Sources:Amigo / QuickGO
Orthologs
Databases	NCBI: entry; OMA: entry
Species	Human	Mouse
Entrez	51582	54375
Ensembl	ENSG00000155096	ENSMUSG00000037458
UniProt	O14977	O35484
RefSeq (mRNA)	NM_001301668; NM_015878; NM_148174; NM_001363010; NM_001363011 NM_001363012; NM_001363013; NM_001363014; NM_001363024; NM_001363083	NM_001102458; NM_001301688; NM_018745
RefSeq (protein)	NP_001288597; NP_056962; NP_680479; NP_001349939; NP_001349940 NP_001349941; NP_001349942; NP_001349943; NP_001349953; NP_001350012	NP_001095928; NP_001288617; NP_061215
Location (UCSC)	Chr 8: 102.83 – 102.89 Mb	Chr 15: 38.49 – 38.52 Mb
PubMed search
- Wikidata
View/Edit Human	View/Edit Mouse

Antizyme inhibitor 1 is a protein that in humans is encoded by the AZIN1 gene.

Ornithine decarboxylase (ODC) catalyzes the conversion of ornithine to putrescine in the first and apparently rate-limiting step in polyamine biosynthesis. Ornithine decarboxylase antizymes play a role in the regulation of polyamine synthesis by binding to and inhibiting ornithine decarboxylase. The protein encoded by this gene is highly similar to ODC. It binds to ODC antizyme and stabilizes ODC, thus inhibiting antizyme-mediated ODC degradation. Two alternatively spliced transcript variants have been found for this gene.
