= N,N′-Ethylenebis(tetrabromophthalimide) =

Names
- IUPAC name 4,5,6,7-tetrabromo-2-[2-(4,5,6,7-tetrabromo-1,3-dioxoisoindol-2-yl)ethyl]isoindole-1,3-dione
- Other names: 1,2-Bis(tetrabromophthalimide)ethane

Identifiers
CAS Number	32588-76-4
3D model (JSmol)	Interactive image
ChemSpider	33278
ECHA InfoCard	100.046.456
EC Number	251-118-6
PubChem CID	36183
UNII	B14GGF3PP8
CompTox Dashboard (EPA)	DTXSID6024626
- InChI: InChI=1S/C18H4Br8N2O4/c19-7-3-4(8(20)12(24)11(7)23)16(30)27(15(3)29)1-2-28-17(31)5-6(18(28)32)10(22)14(26)13(25)9(5)21/h1-2H2 Key: DYIZJUDNMOIZQO-UHFFFAOYSA-N
- SMILES: C(CN1C(=O)C2=C(C1=O)C(=C(C(=C2Br)Br)Br)Br)N3C(=O)C4=C(C3=O)C(=C(C(=C4Br)Br)Br)Br

Properties
Chemical formula	C_{18}H_{4}Br_{8}N_{2}O_{4}
Molar mass	951.472 g·mol^{−1}
Appearance	off-white or light yellow solid
Density	2.67 g/cm^{3}
Melting point	446 °C; 835 °F; 719 K
Solubility in water	insoluble
Refractive index (n_{D})	1.77
- Except where otherwise noted, data are given for materials in their standard state (at 25 °C [77 °F], 100 kPa). Infobox references

N,N′-Ethylenebis(tetrabromophthalimide) is a brominated flame retardant used as an additive in plastics and synthetic rubbers, including polyolefins, HIPS, thermoplastic polyesters, and polycarbonates. Characterized by high thermal and UV stability, it serves as an alternative to other brominated flame retardants. In 2014, the European Commission recommended monitoring EBTEBPI in foods.

== Synthesis ==
The synthesis of N,N′-ethylenebis(tetrabromophthalimide) is achieved by reacting tetrabromophthalic anhydride with ethylenediamine.
