= Rhizoferrin =

Names
- Preferred IUPAC name (2R)-2-[2-({4-[(3S)-3,4-Dicarboxy-3-hydroxybutanamido]butyl}amino)-2-oxoethyl]-2-hydroxybutanedioic acid

Identifiers
CAS Number	138846-62-5
3D model (JSmol)	Interactive image
ChemSpider	170921
PubChem CID	197392
CompTox Dashboard (EPA)	DTXSID101336639
- InChI: InChI=1S/C16H24N2O12/c19-9(5-15(29,13(25)26)7-11(21)22)17-3-1-2-4-18-10(20)6-16(30,14(27)28)8-12(23)24/h29-30H,1-8H2,(H,17,19)(H,18,20)(H,21,22)(H,23,24)(H,25,26)(H,27,28)/t15-,16+ Key: KUYCNLUJQMRORQ-IYBDPMFKSA-N
- SMILES: C(CCNC(=O)C[C@](CC(=O)O)(C(=O)O)O)CNC(=O)C[C@@](CC(=O)O)(C(=O)O)O

Properties
Chemical formula	C_{16}H_{24}N_{2}O_{12}
Molar mass	436.370 g·mol^{−1}
Appearance	white solid

Related compounds
Related compounds	Staphyloferrin A
- Except where otherwise noted, data are given for materials in their standard state (at 25 °C [77 °F], 100 kPa). Infobox references

Rhizoferrin is an organic compound with the formula (CH_{2}CH_{2}NHCOCH_{2}C(OH)(CO_{2}H)CH_{2}CO_{2}H)_{2}. It is multifunctional molecule with two secondary alcohols, four carboxylic acid groups, and two amide groups. In aqueous solution, it is highly ionized, but the term rhizoferrin is still applied to these species.

The compound is a siderophore, which means that is it serves to transport iron from outside the cell into a host organism.

Rhizoferrin is derived from conjugating a pair of citric acid molecules. The pair are connected via a diamide linkage between the putrescine (1,4-diaminobutane) and one of the two unhindered carboxylic acid groups of citric acid. The result is a C_{2}-symmetric hexadentate ligand. A related siderophore is staphyloferrin A, where the two citric acid groups are linked by D-ornithine. The structure of rhizoferrin was established by total synthesis.

Iron(III) is bound tightly to the four carboxylate anions and two tertiary alcohols. The result is a monoanionic octahedral complex.

Structure of the ferric derivative of rhizoferrin.
