= Valine decarboxylase =

Class of enzymes

Identifiers
- EC no.: 4.1.1.14
- CAS no.: 9031-16-7

Databases
- BRENDA: enzyme data
- ExPASy: NiceZyme view
- KEGG: enzyme entry
- MetaCyc: metabolic pathway
- Rhea: reactions
- PDB structures: RCSB PDB PDBe PDBsum
- Gene Ontology: AmiGO / QuickGO
Search
- PMC: articles
- PubMed: articles
- NCBI: proteins

Valine decarboxylase (EC 4.1.1.14) is an enzyme that catalyzes the decarboxylation of valine to isobutylamine and carbon dioxide:

valine
CO_{2}
isobutylamine

The enzyme from Streptomyces viridifaciens has been studied as a means of manufacture of isobutylamine and other amines. It uses pyridoxal phosphate as a cofactor.

This enzyme is a lyase, specifically a carboxy-lyase, which cleave carbon-carbon bonds. The systematic name of this enzyme class is L-valine carboxy-lyase (2-methylpropanamine-forming). Other names in use include leucine decarboxylase and L-valine carboxy-lyase.
