= Isopropylamine =

Chemical compound

Skeletal formula of isopropylamine
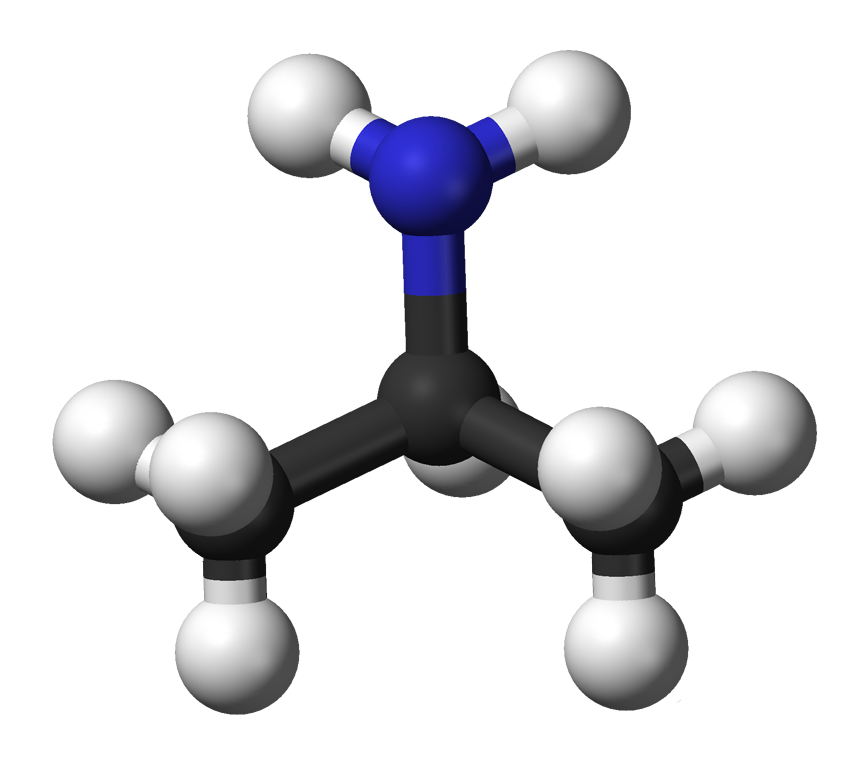
Ball-and-stick model of the isopropylamine molecule

Names
- Preferred IUPAC name Propan-2-amine
- Other names: (Propan-2-yl)amine; Isopropylamine; 2-aminopropane; 2-propanamine; monoisopropylamine; MIPA

Identifiers
CAS Number	75-31-0
3D model (JSmol)	Interactive image
Abbreviations	MIPA i-PrNH_{2} iPrNH_{2}^{i}PrNH_{2}
Beilstein Reference	605259
ChEBI	CHEBI:15739
ChEMBL	ChEMBL117080
ChemSpider	6123
ECHA InfoCard	100.000.783
EC Number	200-860-9
KEGG	C06748
MeSH	2-propylamine
PubChem CID	6363
RTECS number	NT8400000
UNII	P8W26T4MTD
UN number	1221
CompTox Dashboard (EPA)	DTXSID2025682
- InChI: InChI=1S/C3H9N/c1-3(2)4/h3H,4H2,1-2H3 Key: JJWLVOIRVHMVIS-UHFFFAOYSA-N
- SMILES: CC(C)N

Properties
Chemical formula	C_{3}H_{9}N
Molar mass	59.112 g·mol^{−1}
Appearance	Colourless liquid
Odor	"Fishy"; ammoniacal
Density	688 mg mL^{−1}
Melting point	−95.20 °C; −139.36 °F; 177.95 K
Boiling point	31 to 35 °C; 88 to 95 °F; 304 to 308 K
Solubility in water	Miscible
log P	0.391
Vapor pressure	63.41 kPa (at 20 °C)
Refractive index (n_{D})	1.3742

Thermochemistry
Heat capacity (C)	163.85 J K^{−1} mol^{−1}
Std molar entropy (S^{⦵}_{298})	218.32 J K^{−1} mol^{−1}
Std enthalpy of formation (Δ_{f}H^{⦵}_{298})	−113.0–−111.6 kJ mol^{−1}
Std enthalpy of combustion (Δ_{c}H^{⦵}_{298})	−2.3540–−2.3550 MJ mol^{−1}

Hazards
- GHS labelling
Pictograms	(GHS02: Flammable) (GHS07: Exclamation mark)
Signal word	Danger
Hazard statements	H224, H315, H319, H335
Precautionary statements	P210, P261, P305+P351+P338
Flash point	−18 °C (0 °F; 255 K)
Autoignition temperature	402 °C (756 °F; 675 K)
Explosive limits	2–10.4%
- Lethal dose or concentration (LD, LC)
LD_{50} (median dose)	380 mg kg^{−1} (dermal, rabbit); 550 mg kg^{−1} (oral, rat)
LC_{50} (median concentration)	4,000 ppm (rat, 4 hr)
LC_{Lo} (lowest published)	7000 ppm (mouse, 40 min)
- NIOSH (US health exposure limits)
PEL (Permissible)	TWA 5 ppm (12 mg/m^{3})
REL (Recommended)	None established
IDLH (Immediate danger)	750 ppm

Related compounds
Related alkanamines	Ethylamine; Propylamine; 1,2-Diaminopropane; 1,3-Diaminopropane; Isobutylamine; tert-Butylamine; n-Butylamine; sec-Butylamine; Putrescine
Related compounds	2-Methyl-2-nitrosopropane
- Except where otherwise noted, data are given for materials in their standard state (at 25 °C [77 °F], 100 kPa). verify (what is ?) Infobox references

Isopropylamine (also known as monoisopropyl amine, MIPA, or 2-propylamine) is an organic compound, an amine. It is a hygroscopic colorless liquid with ammonia-like odor. It is miscible with water and flammable. It is a valuable intermediate in chemical industry.

== Reactions ==
Isopropylamine exhibits reactions typical of other simple alkyl amines, i.e. protonation, alkylation, acylation, condensation with carbonyls. Like other simple aliphatic amines, isopropylamine is a weak base: the pK_{a} of [(CH_{3})_{2})CHNH_{3}]^{+} is 10.63.

== Preparation and use ==
Isopropylamine can be obtained by reaction of isopropyl alcohol with ammonia in presence of a catalyst:

(CH_{3})_{2}CHOH + NH_{3} → (CH_{3})_{2}CHNH_{2} + H_{2}O

Isopropylamine is a building block for the preparation of many herbicides and pesticides including atrazine, bentazon, glyphosate, imazapyr, ametryne, desmetryn, prometryn, pramitol, dipropetryn, propazine, fenamiphos, and iprodione. It is a regulating agent for plastics, an intermediate in organic synthesis of coating materials, plastics, pesticides, rubber chemicals, pharmaceuticals and others, and is an additive in the petroleum industry.
