= 1,3-Diaminopropane =

- Structural formula of 1,3-diaminopropane

Names
- Preferred IUPAC name Propane-1,3-diamine
- Other names: Propandiamine; 1,3-Propylenediamine; Trimethylenediamine; 3-Aminopropylamine

Identifiers
CAS Number	109-76-2
3D model (JSmol)	Interactive image
Beilstein Reference	605277
ChEBI	CHEBI:15725
ChEMBL	ChEMBL174324
ChemSpider	415
ECHA InfoCard	100.003.367
EC Number	203-702-7
Gmelin Reference	1298
KEGG	C00986
MeSH	trimethylenediamine
PubChem CID	428
RTECS number	TX6825000
UNII	CB3ISL56KG
UN number	2922
CompTox Dashboard (EPA)	DTXSID1021906
- InChI: InChI=1S/C3H10N2/c4-2-1-3-5/h1-5H2 Key: XFNJVJPLKCPIBV-UHFFFAOYSA-N
- SMILES: NCCCN

Properties
Chemical formula	C_{3}H_{10}N_{2}
Molar mass	74.127 g·mol^{−1}
Appearance	Colourless liquid
Odor	Fishy, ammoniacal
Density	0.888 g mL^{−1}
Melting point	−12.00 °C; 10.40 °F; 261.15 K
Boiling point	140.1 °C; 284.1 °F; 413.2 K
log P	−1.4
Vapor pressure	<1.1 kPa or 11.5 mm Hg(at 20 °C)
Magnetic susceptibility (χ)	−58.1·10^{−6} cm^{3}/mol
Refractive index (n_{D})	1.458

Hazards
- GHS labelling
Pictograms	(GHS02: Flammable) (GHS05: Corrosive) (GHS06: Toxic)
Signal word	Danger
Hazard statements	H226, H302, H310, H314
Precautionary statements	P280, P302+P350, P305+P351+P338, P310
NFPA 704 (fire diamond)	3 3 0
Flash point	51 °C (124 °F; 324 K)
Autoignition temperature	350 °C (662 °F; 623 K)
Explosive limits	2.8–15.2%
- Lethal dose or concentration (LD, LC)
LD_{50} (median dose)	177 mg kg^{−1} (dermal, rabbit); 700 mg kg^{−1} (oral, rat)

Related compounds
Related alkanamines	Ethylamine; Ethylenediamine; Propylamine; Isopropylamine; 1,2-Diaminopropane; Isobutylamine; tert-Butylamine; n-Butylamine; sec-Butylamine; Putrescine
Related compounds	2-Methyl-2-nitrosopropane
- Except where otherwise noted, data are given for materials in their standard state (at 25 °C [77 °F], 100 kPa). verify (what is ?) Infobox references

1,3-Diaminopropane, also known as trimethylenediamine, is a simple diamine with the formula H_{2}N(CH_{2})_{3}NH_{2}. A colourless liquid with a fishy odor, it is soluble in water and many polar organic solvents. It is isomeric with 1,2-diaminopropane. Both are building blocks in the synthesis of heterocycles, such as those used in textile finishing, and coordination complexes. It is prepared by the amination of acrylonitrile followed by hydrogenation of the resulting aminopropionitrile.

The potassium salt was used in the alkyne zipper reaction.

== Applications ==
Spermidines, imipramine, and phenothiazine-type structures, eprobemide, cannabisativine, codonocarpine, palustridine, palustrine, oncinotine & pithecolobine have 1,3-diaminopropane in their structures.

== Safety ==
1,3-Diaminopropane is toxic on skin exposure with an LD_{50} of 177 mg kg^{−1} (dermal, rabbit)
