= N,N'-Di-n-butylthiourea =

N,N′-Di-n-butylthiourea

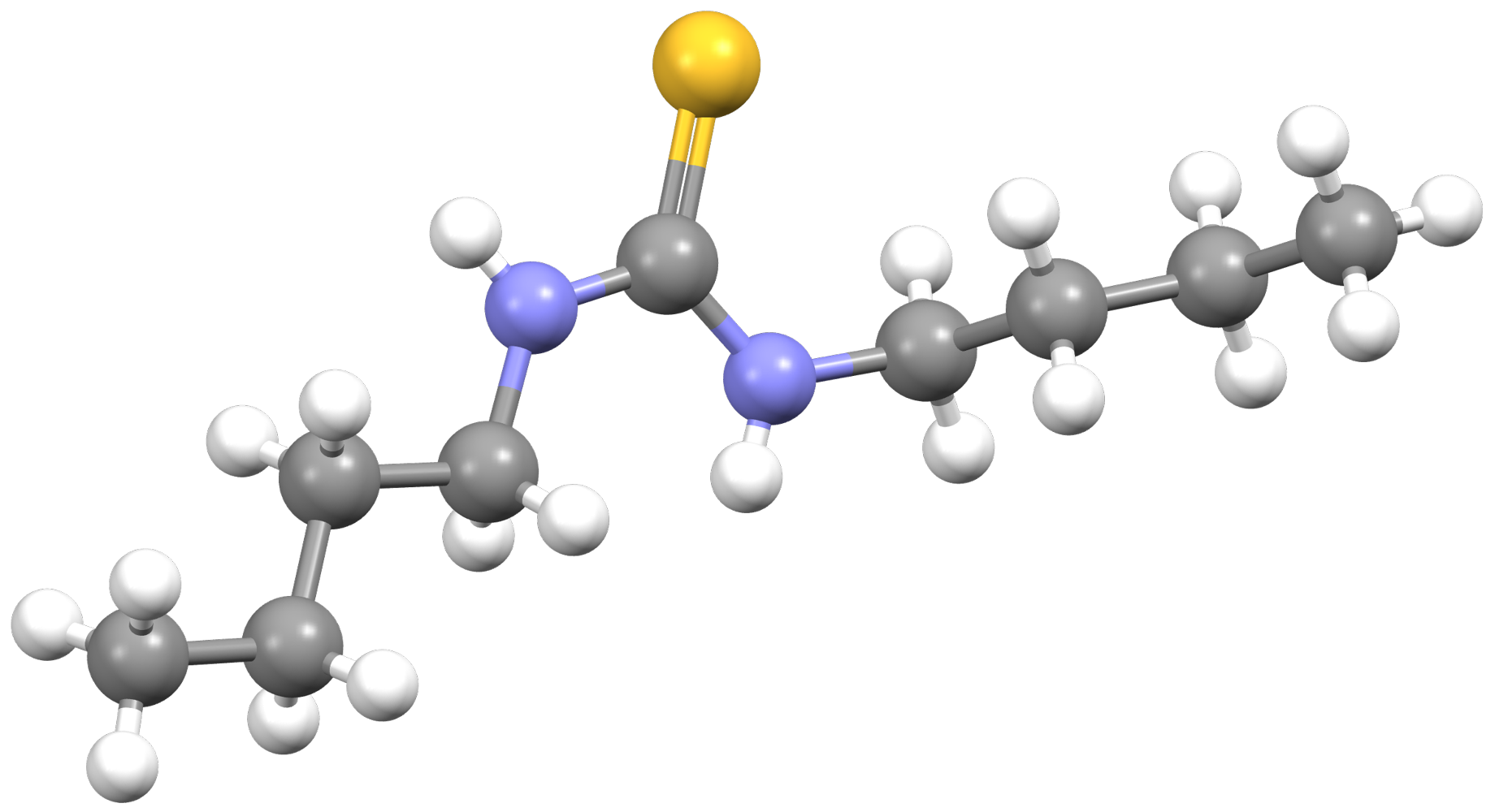

Names
- Preferred IUPAC name N,N′-Dibutylthiourea
- Other names 1,3-Dibutylthiourea; 1,3-Di-n-butylthiourea; Bis(butylamino)methane-1-thione

Identifiers
| CAS Number | 109-46-6 |
| 3D model (JSmol) | Interactive image |
| ChemSpider | 2005824 |
| ECHA InfoCard | 100.003.341 |
| PubChem CID | 2723622 |
| UNII | 3154M2Q6GD |
| CompTox Dashboard (EPA) | DTXSID8042187 |
- InChI: InChI=1S/C9H20N2S/c1-3-5-7-10-9(12)11-8-6-4-2/h3-8H2,1-2H3,(H2,10,11,12) Key: KFFQABQEJATQAT-UHFFFAOYSA-N
- SMILES: CCCCNC(=S)NCCCC

Properties
| Chemical formula | C_{9}H_{20}N_{2}S |
| Molar mass | 188.33 g·mol^{−1} |
| Appearance | White to yellowish crystals |
| Density | 1.089 g cm^{−3} (diffraction) |
| Melting point | 64 to 67 °C (147 to 153 °F; 337 to 340 K) |

Structure
| Crystal structure | monoclinic |
| Space group | P2_{1}/c, No. 14 |
| Lattice constant | a = 12.6395(6) Å, b = 10.0836(6) Å, c = 9.0128(5) Å α = 90°, β = 90.476(5)°, γ = 90° |
- Except where otherwise noted, data are given for materials in their standard state (at 25 °C [77 °F], 100 kPa). Infobox references

N,N′-Di-n-butylthiourea is an organic compound with the formula S=C(N(H)Bu)_{2} (Bu = butyl). A symmetrical N,N′-dialkyl thiourea derivative, it is a white solid. Like other thiourea derivatives, it features a planar core. The C=S bond distance is 1.712(2) Å, while C−N distances are in range of 1.33 to 1.46 Å. Molecules of this compound exhibit syn-anti conformation.

== Synthesis ==
N,N′-Di-n-butylthiourea can be obtained in these routes:

- Reaction of n-butylamine with carbon disulfide in the presence of alumina.
- Reaction of n-butylamine and n-butylisothiocyanate.
