= Nylon 46 =

Nylon 4:6

Names
- IUPAC name Poly[imino(1,6-dioxohexamethylene) iminotetramethylene]
- Other names Poly(hexamethylene succinamide); Poly(N,N′-tetramethyleneadipinediamide); Nylon 4-6; Nylon 4/6; Nylon 4,6; PA46; Polyamide 46, Stanyl

Identifiers
CAS Number	50327-22-5
ChemSpider	none
ECHA InfoCard	100.127.285

Properties
Chemical formula	(C_{10}H_{18}N_{2}O_{2})_{n}
Density	1.19 g/mL (Quadrant Ertalon 46)
Melting point	290 °C; 554 °F; 563 K (Quadrant Ertalon 46)
- Except where otherwise noted, data are given for materials in their standard state (at 25 °C [77 °F], 100 kPa). Infobox references

Nylon 46 (nylon 4-6, nylon 4/6 or nylon 4,6, PA46, Polyamide 46) is a high heat resistant polyamide or nylon. Envalior (formerly DSM) is the only commercial supplier of this resin, which markets under the trade name Stanyl. Nylon 46 is an aliphatic polyamide formed by the polycondensation of two monomers, one containing 4 carbon atoms, 1,4-diaminobutane (putrescine), and the other 6 carbon atoms, adipic acid, which give nylon 46 its name. It has a higher melting point than nylon 6 or nylon 66 and mainly used in applications which must withstand high temperatures.

Nylon 46 withstands high loads and stresses at high temperatures and exposure to aggressive environments, and is therefore suitable for automotive applications. Typical applications are to be found in the engine and transmission, engine-management, air-inlet, brake, air cooling and electronic systems. Many automotive components have also been produced in nylon 46, because of its excellent creep resistance, toughness and good wear characteristics. As a result of its intrinsic properties nylon 46 has been successfully applied in the following applications and electronics and electrical end-markets.

== Development ==
As early as the 1930s, when Wallace Carothers produced Nylon for the first time, he noticed nylon 46 has a melting point (Tm) of 278 °C. Due to the intra-molecular deamination of butanediamine to produce pyrrole during heating, the molecular weight growth becomes difficult because pyrrole acts as a terminator in polycondensation. Without precise control over polymerization processes, one can only get a dark color low molecular weight oligomer without any commercial value. When he discovered the more valuable nylon 66, the development of nylon 46 was shelved.

In 1977, pale to white high-molecular-weight nylon 46 (Mw = 45,000, inherent viscosity 2.09 in 98% formic acid at 30 °C) was produced through a solid-state polymerization (SSP) technique by Gaymans et al., which gave hope to industrialization of nylon 46.

DSM cooperated with Twente University of Technology to accomplish the commercialization of nylon 46 in May 1984, and DSM announced that it had mastered the industrialized process of nylon 46. In late 1985, a 150 t/a pilot-plant was built; in 1990, a nylon 46 full scale plant was run in Geleen, The Netherlands. According to patents and the literature, one can conclude that the color of the product is key to the industrialization of nylon 46.

== Chemical Reaction of Producing Nylon 6:6 ==
It's a condensation polymer. In condensation polymerization reactions, when monomer molecules are joined together, smaller molecules are removed. Heating adipic acid with hexamethylenediamine in the presence of rutile produces nylon 6:6.

== Chemical properties ==
Although there are similarities between the molecular structure of nylon 46 and that of nylon 66, the higher number of amide groups per given chain length and the more symmetrical chain structure of nylon 46 result in the higher melting temperature of 295 °C, a higher crystallinity, and a faster rate of crystallization.

Nylon 46's crystallinity is approximately 70%, compared with 50% for nylon 66. This results in a high heat distortion temperature of 190 °C for unreinforced nylon 46 and 290 °C for glass fiber reinforced nylon 46.

These features give nylon 46 a technical edge over other engineering plastics like polyamide 6 and 66, polyesters and semi-aromatic polyamides (PPAs) with regard to heat resistance, mechanical properties at elevated temperatures, wear and friction behavior. Due to an advantage in cycle-time, improved processing economics, nylon 46 has significant characteristics of a high amide group concentration and a high rigidity of molecular chain, leading to a high degree of crystallization, good rigidity at high temperature and higher water-absorption.
