= Ethylamine =

Skeletal formula of ethylamine
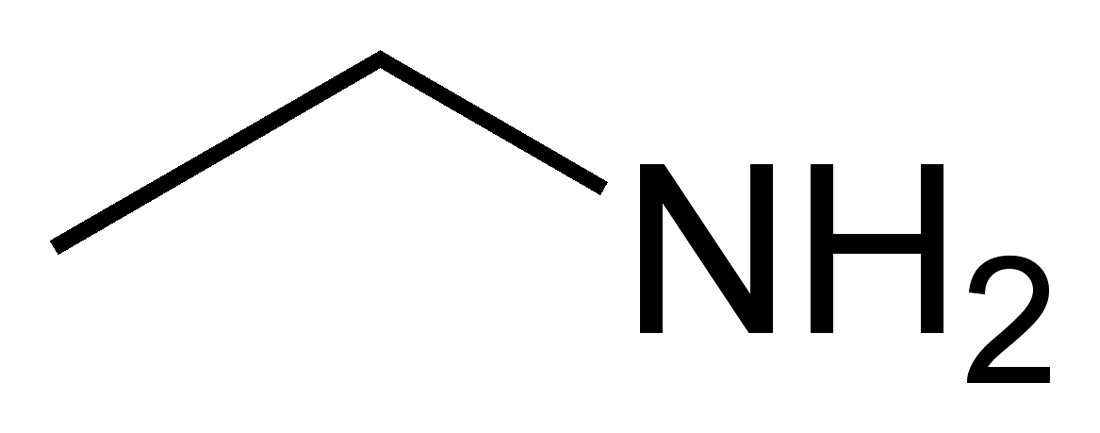

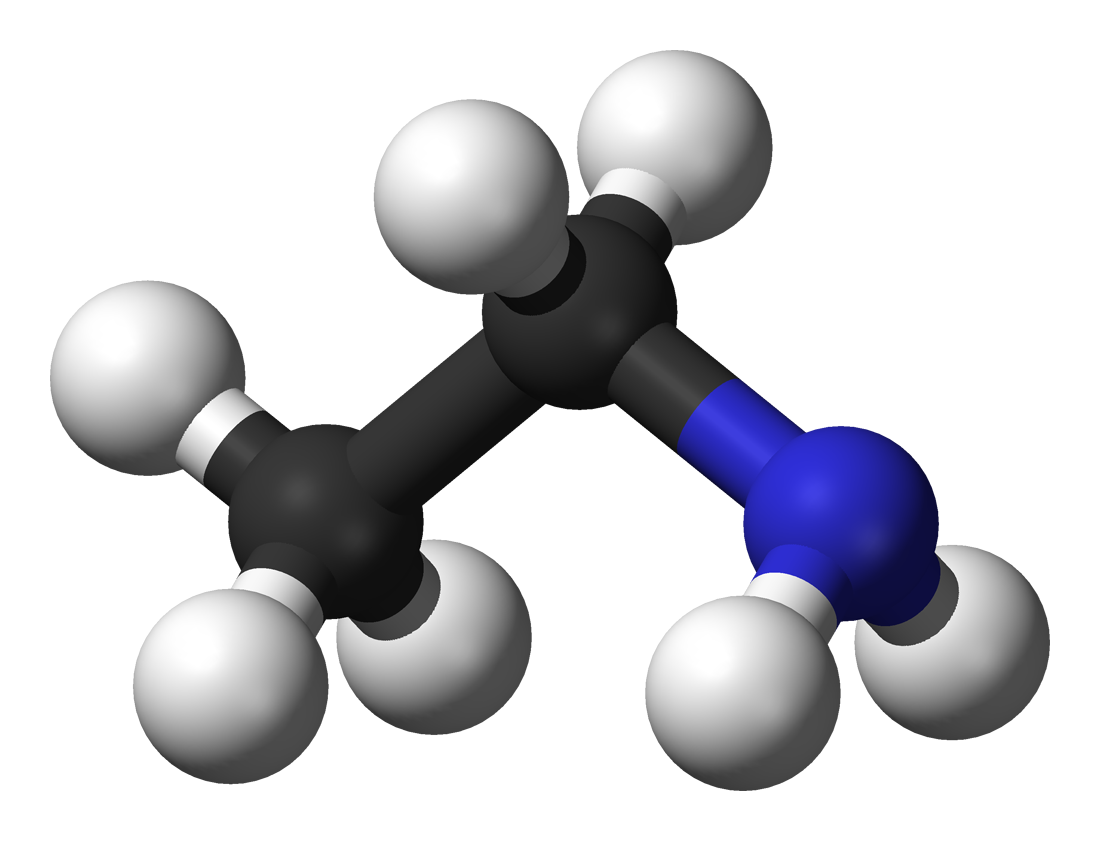
Ball and stick model of ethylamine
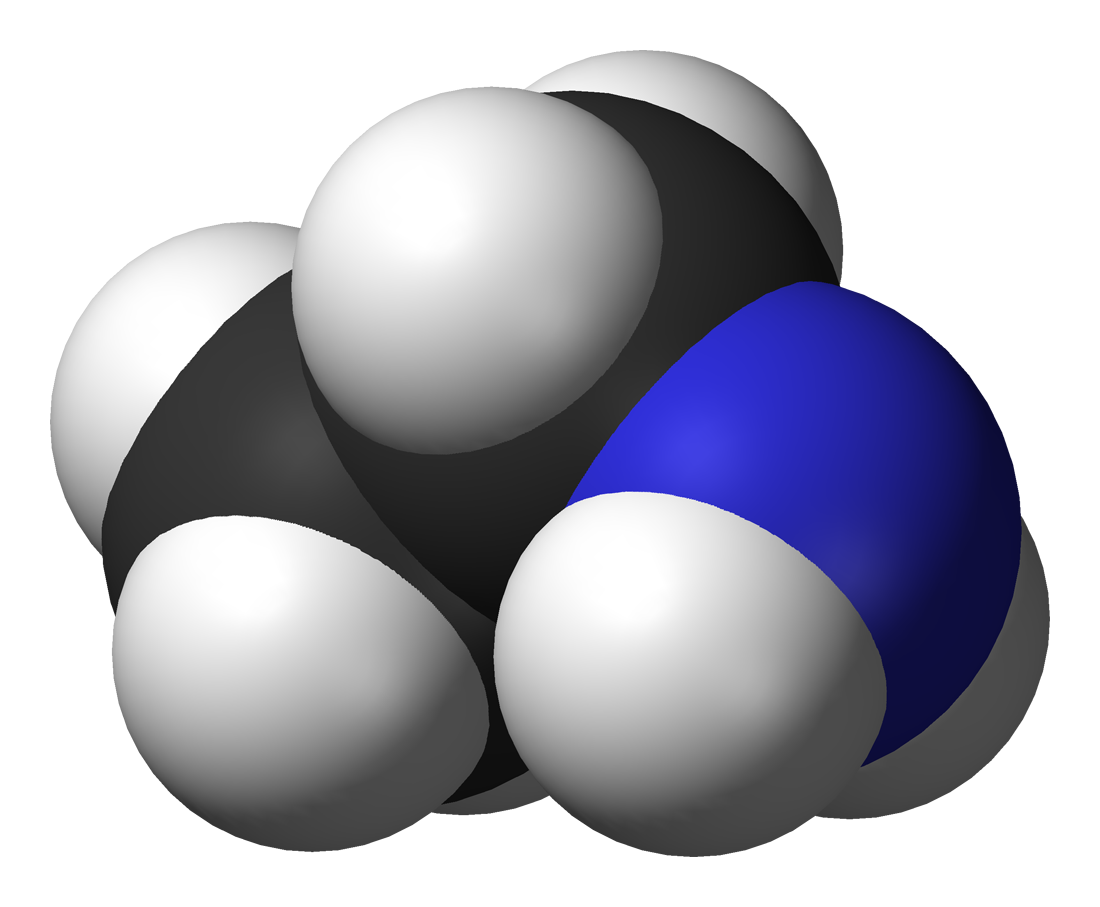
Spacefill model of ethylamine

Names
- Preferred IUPAC name Ethanamine
- Other names Ethylamine

Identifiers
CAS Number	75-04-7
3D model (JSmol)	Interactive image
Abbreviations	EtNH_{2}
Beilstein Reference	505933
ChEBI	CHEBI:15862
ChEMBL	ChEMBL14449
ChemSpider	6101
ECHA InfoCard	100.000.759
EC Number	200-834-7
Gmelin Reference	897
KEGG	C00797
MeSH	ethylamine
PubChem CID	6341
RTECS number	KH2100000
UNII	YG6MGA6AT5
UN number	1036
CompTox Dashboard (EPA)	DTXSID8025678
- InChI: InChI=1S/C2H7N/c1-2-3/h2-3H2,1H3 Key: QUSNBJAOOMFDIB-UHFFFAOYSA-N
- SMILES: CCN

Properties
Chemical formula	C_{2}H_{7}N
Molar mass	45.085 g·mol^{−1}
Appearance	Colourless gas
Odor	fishy, ammoniacal
Density	688 kg m^{−3} (at 15 °C)
Melting point	−85 to −79 °C; −121 to −110 °F; 188 to 194 K
Boiling point	16 to 20 °C; 61 to 68 °F; 289 to 293 K
Solubility in water	Miscible
log P	0.037
Vapor pressure	116.5 kPa (at 20 °C)
Henry's law constant (k_{H})	350 μmol Pa^{−1} kg^{−1}
Acidity (pK_{a})	10.8 (for the Conjugate acid)
Basicity (pK_{b})	3.2

Thermochemistry
Std enthalpy of formation (Δ_{f}H^{⦵}_{298})	−57.7 kJ mol^{−1}

Hazards
- GHS labelling
Pictograms	(GHS02: Flammable) (GHS07: Exclamation mark)
Signal word	Danger
Hazard statements	H220, H319, H335
Precautionary statements	P210, P261, P305+P351+P338, P410+P403
NFPA 704 (fire diamond)	3 4 0
Flash point	−37 °C (−35 °F; 236 K)
Autoignition temperature	383 °C (721 °F; 656 K)
Explosive limits	3.5–14%
- Lethal dose or concentration (LD, LC)
LD_{50} (median dose)	265 mg kg^{−1} (dermal, rabbit); 400 mg kg^{−1} (oral, rat)
LC_{50} (median concentration)	1230 ppm (mammal)
LC_{Lo} (lowest published)	3000 ppm (rat, 4 hr); 4000 ppm (rat, 4 hr)
- NIOSH (US health exposure limits)
PEL (Permissible)	TWA 10 ppm (18 mg/m^{3})
REL (Recommended)	TWA 10 ppm (18 mg/m^{3})
IDLH (Immediate danger)	600 ppm

Related compounds
Related alkanamines	Methylamine; Ethylenediamine; Propylamine; Isopropylamine; 1,2-Diaminopropane; 1,3-Diaminopropane; Isobutylamine; tert-Butylamine
Related compounds	Monomethylhydrazine; 2-Methyl-2-nitrosopropane
- Except where otherwise noted, data are given for materials in their standard state (at 25 °C [77 °F], 100 kPa). verify (what is ?) Infobox references

Ethylamine, also known as ethanamine, is an organic compound with the formula C_{2}H_{7}N or CH_{3}CH_{2}NH_{2}. This colourless gas has a strong ammonia-like odor. It condenses just below room temperature to a liquid miscible with virtually all solvents. It is a nucleophilic base, as is typical for amines. Ethylamine is widely used in chemical industry and organic synthesis. It is a DEA list I chemical by 21 CFR § 1310.02.

== Synthesis ==
Ethylamine is produced on a large scale by two processes. Most commonly ethanol and ammonia are combined in the presence of an oxide catalyst:

$$\ce{CH3CH2OH + NH3 -> CH3CH2NH2 + H2O}$$

In this reaction, ethylamine is coproduced together with diethylamine and triethylamine. In aggregate, approximately 80M kilograms/year of these three amines are produced industrially. It is also produced by reductive amination of acetaldehyde.

$$\ce{CH3CH2OH + NH3 + H2 -> CH3CH2NH2 + H2O}$$

Ethylamine can be prepared by several other routes, but these are not economical. Ethylene and ammonia combine to give ethylamine in the presence of a sodium amide or related basic catalysts.

$$\ce{H2C=CH2 + NH3 -> CH3CH2NH2}$$

Hydrogenation of acetonitrile, acetamide, and nitroethane affords ethylamine. These reactions can be effected stoichiometrically using lithium aluminium hydride. In another route, ethylamine can be synthesized via nucleophilic substitution of a haloethane (such as chloroethane or bromoethane) with ammonia, utilizing a strong base such as potassium hydroxide. This method affords significant amounts of byproducts, including diethylamine and triethylamine.

$$\ce{CH3CH2Cl + NH3 + KOH -> CH3CH2NH2 + KCl + H2O}$$

Ethylamine is also produced naturally in the cosmos; it is a component of interstellar gases.

== Reactions ==
Like other simple aliphatic amines, ethylamine is a weak base: the pK_{a} of [CH_{3}CH_{2}NH_{3}]^{+} has been determined to be 10.8

Ethylamine undergoes the reactions anticipated for a primary alkyl amine, such as acylation and protonation. Reaction with sulfuryl chloride followed by oxidation of the sulfonamide give diethyldiazene, EtN=NEt. Ethylamine may be oxidized using a strong oxidizer such as potassium permanganate to form acetaldehyde.

Ethylamine like some other small primary amines is a good solvent for lithium metal, giving the ion [Li(amine)_{4}]^{+} and the solvated electron. Such solutions are used for the reduction of unsaturated organic compounds, such as naphthalenes and alkynes.

== Applications ==
Ethylamine is a precursor to many herbicides including atrazine and simazine. It is found in rubber products as well.

Ethylamine is used as a precursor chemical along with benzonitrile (as opposed to o-chlorobenzonitrile and methylamine in ketamine synthesis) in the clandestine synthesis of cyclidine dissociative anesthetic agents (the analogue of ketamine which is missing the 2-chloro group on the phenyl ring, and its N-ethyl analog) which are closely related to the well known anesthetic agent ketamine and the recreational drug phencyclidine and have been detected on the black market, being marketed for use as a recreational hallucinogen and tranquilizer. This produces a cyclidine with the same mechanism of action as ketamine (NMDA receptor antagonism) but with a much greater potency at the PCP binding site, a longer half-life, and significantly more prominent parasympathomimetic effects.
