= 4-Trifluoromethylbenzaldehyde =

Names
- Preferred IUPAC name 4-(Trifluoromethyl)benzaldehyde
- Other names α,α,α-trifluoro-4-tolualdehyde

Identifiers
CAS Number	455-19-6
3D model (JSmol)	Interactive image
ChEBI	CHEBI:156309
ChEMBL	ChEMBL4473405
ChemSpider	61311
EC Number	207-240-7
PubChem CID	67996
- InChI: InChI=1S/C8H5F3O/c9-8(10,11)7-3-1-6(5-12)2-4-7/h1-5H Key: BEOBZEOPTQQELP-UHFFFAOYSA-N
- SMILES: C1=CC(=CC=C1C=O)C(F)(F)F

Properties
Chemical formula	C_{8}H_{5}F_{3}O
Molar mass	174.122 g·mol^{−1}
Appearance	colorless oil
Density	1.275
Melting point	1–2 °C (34–36 °F; 274–275 K)
Boiling point	64 °C (147 °F; 337 K) 12 torr
Refractive index (n_{D})	1.463

Hazards
- GHS labelling
Pictograms	(GHS07: Exclamation mark)
Signal word	Warning
Hazard statements	H315, H319, H335
Precautionary statements	P261, P264, P264+P265, P270, P271, P280, P301+P317, P302+P352, P304+P340, P305+P351+P338, P319, P321, P330, P332+P317, P337+P317, P362+P364, P403+P233, P405, P501
- Except where otherwise noted, data are given for materials in their standard state (at 25 °C [77 °F], 100 kPa). Infobox references

4-Trifluoromethylbenzaldehyde is the organofluorine compound with the formula CF_{3}C_{6}H_{4}CHO. Two other isomers are also known: 2-trifluoromethylbenzaldehyde and 3-trifluoromethylbenzaldehyde. These compounds are derivatives of benzaldehyde with trifluoromethyl substituents. The CF_{3} group enhances the electrophilicity of the formyl group and provides a label for analysis by fluorine-19 nuclear magnetic resonance spectroscopy.

== Synthesis and reactions ==
It can be prepared by a Suzuki-Miyaura coupling from the 4-trifluoromethylphenylboronic acid. Complementarily, it can be produced by trifluoromethylation of 4-formylphenylboronic acid.

It readily condenses with amines to give imines. It has been used in the synthesis of pharmaceuticals, such as Lanperisone.
