= Polyamine oxidase (propane-1,3-diamine-forming) =

Identifiers
- EC no.: 1.5.3.14

Databases
- IntEnz: IntEnz view
- BRENDA: BRENDA entry
- ExPASy: NiceZyme view
- KEGG: KEGG entry
- MetaCyc: metabolic pathway
- PRIAM: profile
- PDB structures: RCSB PDB PDBe PDBsum
Search
- PMC: articles
- PubMed: articles
- NCBI: proteins

Polyamine oxidase (propane-1,3-diamine-forming) (EC 1.5.3.14, MPAO, maize PAO) is an enzyme with systematic name spermidine:oxygen oxidoreductase (propane-1,3-diamine-forming). This enzyme catalyses the following chemical reaction

spermidine + O_{2} + H_{2}O $\rightleftharpoons$ propane-1,3-diamine + 4-aminobutanal + H_{2}O_{2}

The products of the reaction cannot be converted directly to other polyamines.
