= N-Butylamine =

n-Butylamine
- Skeletal formula of n-butylamine

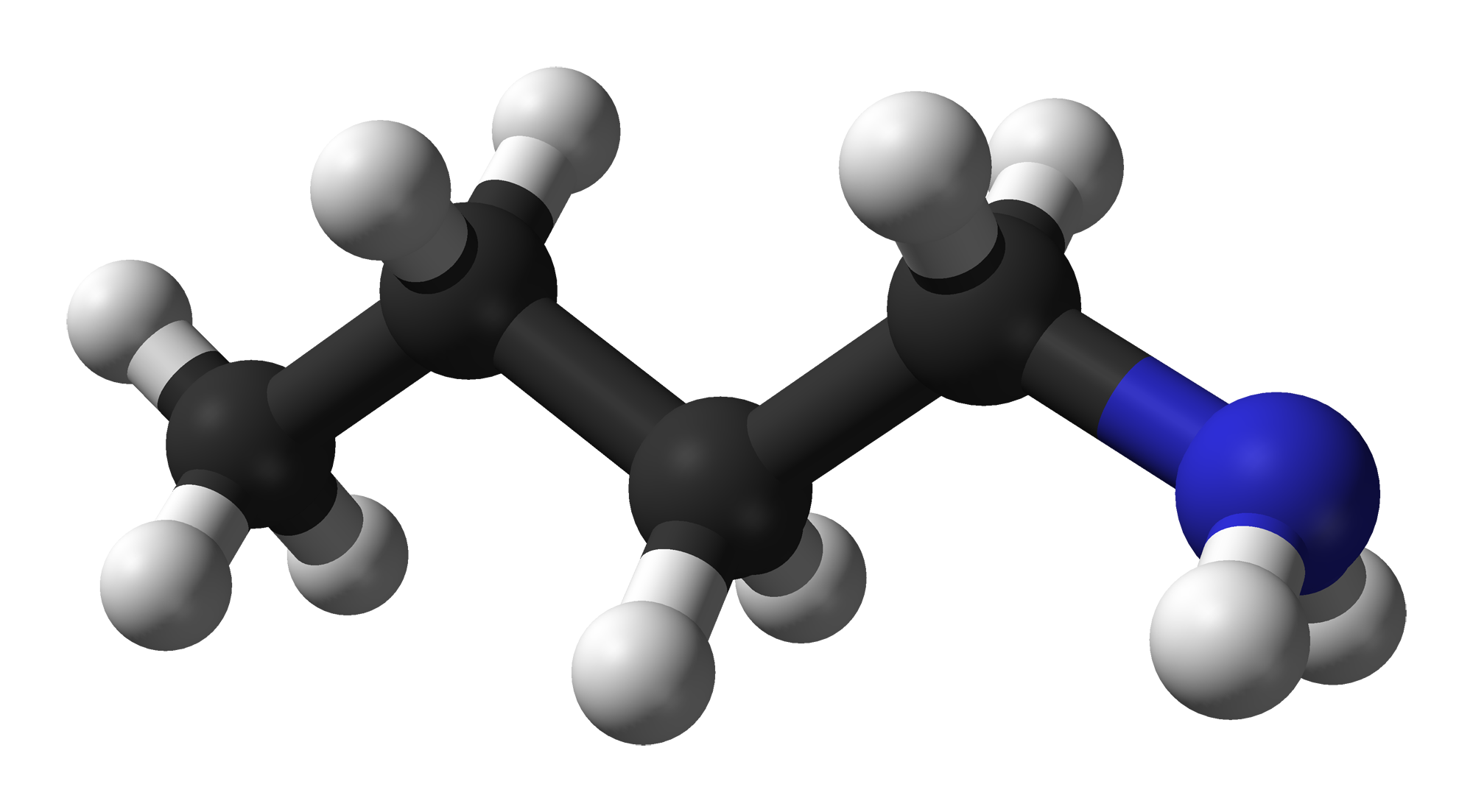

Names
- Preferred IUPAC name Butan-1-amine
- Other names: 1-Aminobutane; 1-Butanamine; Monobutylamine

Identifiers
CAS Number	109-73-9
3D model (JSmol)	Interactive image
Abbreviations	NBA; BuNH_{2} n-BuNH_{2} nBuNH_{2}^{n}BuNH_{2}
Beilstein Reference	605269
ChEBI	CHEBI:43799
ChEMBL	ChEMBL13968
ChemSpider	7716
DrugBank	DB03659
ECHA InfoCard	100.003.364
EC Number	203-699-2
Gmelin Reference	1784
MeSH	n-butylamine
PubChem CID	8007
RTECS number	EO29750002
UNII	N2QV60B4WR
UN number	1125
CompTox Dashboard (EPA)	DTXSID1021904
- InChI: InChI=1S/C4H11N/c1-2-3-4-5/h2-5H2,1H3 Key: HQABUPZFAYXKJW-UHFFFAOYSA-N
- SMILES: CCCCN

Properties
Chemical formula	C_{4}H_{11}N
Molar mass	73.139 g·mol^{−1}
Appearance	Colorless liquid
Odor	fishy, ammoniacal
Density	740 mg ml^{−1}
Melting point	−49 °C; −56 °F; 224 K
Boiling point	77 to 79 °C; 170 to 174 °F; 350 to 352 K
Solubility in water	Miscible
log P	1.056
Vapor pressure	9.1 kPa (at 20 °C)
Henry's law constant (k_{H})	570 μmol Pa^{−1} kg^{−1}
Basicity (pK_{b})	3.22
Magnetic susceptibility (χ)	−58.9·10^{−6} cm^{3}/mol
Refractive index (n_{D})	1.401
Viscosity	500 µPa s (at 20 °C)

Thermochemistry
Heat capacity (C)	188 J K^{−1} mol^{−1}
Std enthalpy of formation (Δ_{f}H^{⦵}_{298})	−128.9 – −126.5 kJ mol^{−1}
Std enthalpy of combustion (Δ_{c}H^{⦵}_{298})	−3.0196 – −3.0174 MJ mol^{−1}

Hazards
- GHS labelling
Pictograms	(GHS02: Flammable) (GHS05: Corrosive) (GHS07: Exclamation mark)
Signal word	Danger
Hazard statements	H225, H302, H312, H314, H332
Precautionary statements	P210, P280, P305+P351+P338, P310
NFPA 704 (fire diamond)	2 3 0
Flash point	−7 °C (19 °F; 266 K)
Autoignition temperature	312 °C (594 °F; 585 K)
Explosive limits	1.7–9.8%
- Lethal dose or concentration (LD, LC)
LD_{50} (median dose)	366 mg kg^{−1} (oral, rat); 626 mg kg^{−1} (dermal, rabbit); 430 mg kg^{−1} (oral, mouse); 430 mg kg^{−1} (oral, guinea pig)
LC_{Lo} (lowest published)	4000 ppm (rat, 4 hr); 263 ppm (mouse, 2 hr)
- NIOSH (US health exposure limits)
PEL (Permissible)	C 5 ppm (15 mg/m^{3}) [skin]
REL (Recommended)	C 5 ppm (15 mg/m^{3}) [skin]
IDLH (Immediate danger)	300 ppm
Safety data sheet (SDS)	hazard.com

Related compounds
Related alkanamines	Propylamine; Isopropylamine; 1,2-Diaminopropane; 1,3-Diaminopropane; Isobutylamine; tert-Butylamine; sec-Butylamine; Putrescine; Pentylamine; Cadaverine
Related compounds	2-Methyl-2-nitrosopropane
- Except where otherwise noted, data are given for materials in their standard state (at 25 °C [77 °F], 100 kPa). verify (what is ?) Infobox references

n-Butylamine is an organic compound (specifically, an amine) with the formula CH_{3}(CH_{2})_{3}NH_{2}. This colourless liquid is one of the four isomeric amines of butane, the others being sec-butylamine, tert-butylamine, and isobutylamine. It is a liquid having the fishy, ammonia-like odor common to amines. The liquid acquires a yellow color upon storage in air. It is soluble in all organic solvents. Its vapours are heavier than air and it produces toxic oxides of nitrogen during combustion.

== Synthesis and reactions ==
It is produced by the reaction of ammonia and alcohols over alumina:

$$\ce{CH3(CH2)3OH + NH3 -> CH3(CH2)3NH2 +  H2O}$$

n-Butylamine is a weak base. The pK_{a} of [CH_{3}(CH_{2})_{3}NH_{3}]^{+} is 10.78.

n-Butylamine exhibits reactions typical of other simple alkyl amines, i.e., alkylation, acylation, condensation with carbonyls. It forms complexes with metal ions, examples being cis- and trans-[PtI_{2}(NH_{2}Bu)_{2}].

== Uses ==
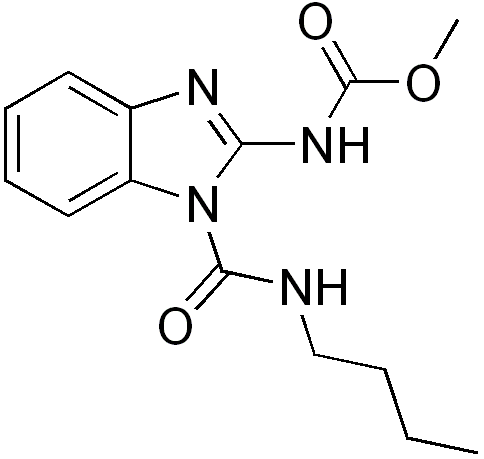
Butylamine is a precursor to the fungicide benomyl.

This compound is used as an ingredient in the manufacture of pesticides (such as thiocarbazides), pharmaceuticals, and emulsifiers. It is also a precursor for the manufacture of N,N′-dibutylthiourea, a rubber vulcanization accelerator, and n-butylbenzenesulfonamide, a plasticizer of nylon. It is used in the synthesis of fengabine, the fungicide benomyl, and butamoxane, and the antidiabetic tolbutamide.

== Safety ==
The LD_{50} to rats through the oral exposure route is 366 mg/kg.

In regards to occupational exposures to n-butylamine, the Occupational Safety and Health Administration and National Institute for Occupational Safety and Health have set occupational exposure limits at a ceiling of 5 ppm (15 mg/m^{3}) for dermal exposure.
