= N1-acetylpolyamine oxidase =

N^{1}-acetylpolyamine oxidase

Identifiers
- EC no.: 1.5.3.13

Databases
- IntEnz: IntEnz view
- BRENDA: BRENDA entry
- ExPASy: NiceZyme view
- KEGG: KEGG entry
- MetaCyc: metabolic pathway
- PRIAM: profile
- PDB structures: RCSB PDB PDBe PDBsum
Search
- PMC: articles
- PubMed: articles
- NCBI: proteins

N^{1}-acetylpolyamine oxidase (EC 1.5.3.13, hPAO-1, mPAO, hPAO) is an enzyme with systematic name N^{1}-acetylpolyamine:oxygen oxidoreductase (3-acetamidopropanal-forming). This enzyme catalyses the following chemical reaction

(1) N^{1}-acetylspermidine + O_{2} + H_{2}O $\rightleftharpoons$ putrescine + 3-acetamidopropanal + H_{2}O_{2}
(2) N^{1}-acetylspermine + O_{2} + H_{2}O $\rightleftharpoons$ spermidine + 3-acetamidopropanal + H_{2}O_{2}

This enzyme also catalyses the reaction:

N^{1},N^{12}-diacetylspermine + O_{2} + H_{2}O $\rightleftharpoons$ N_{1}-acetylspermidine + 3-acetamamidopropanal + H_{2}O_{2}.
