= Propylamine =

Skeletal formula of propylamine
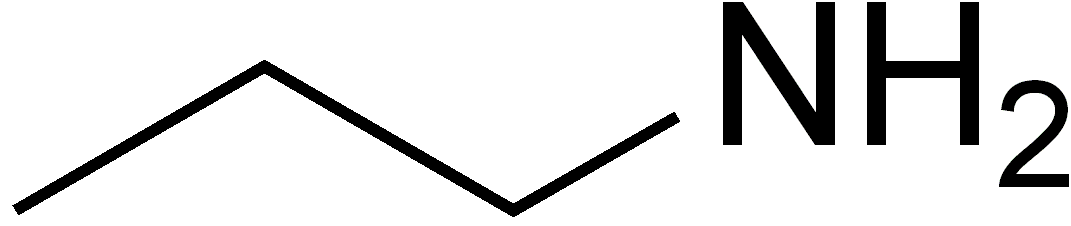

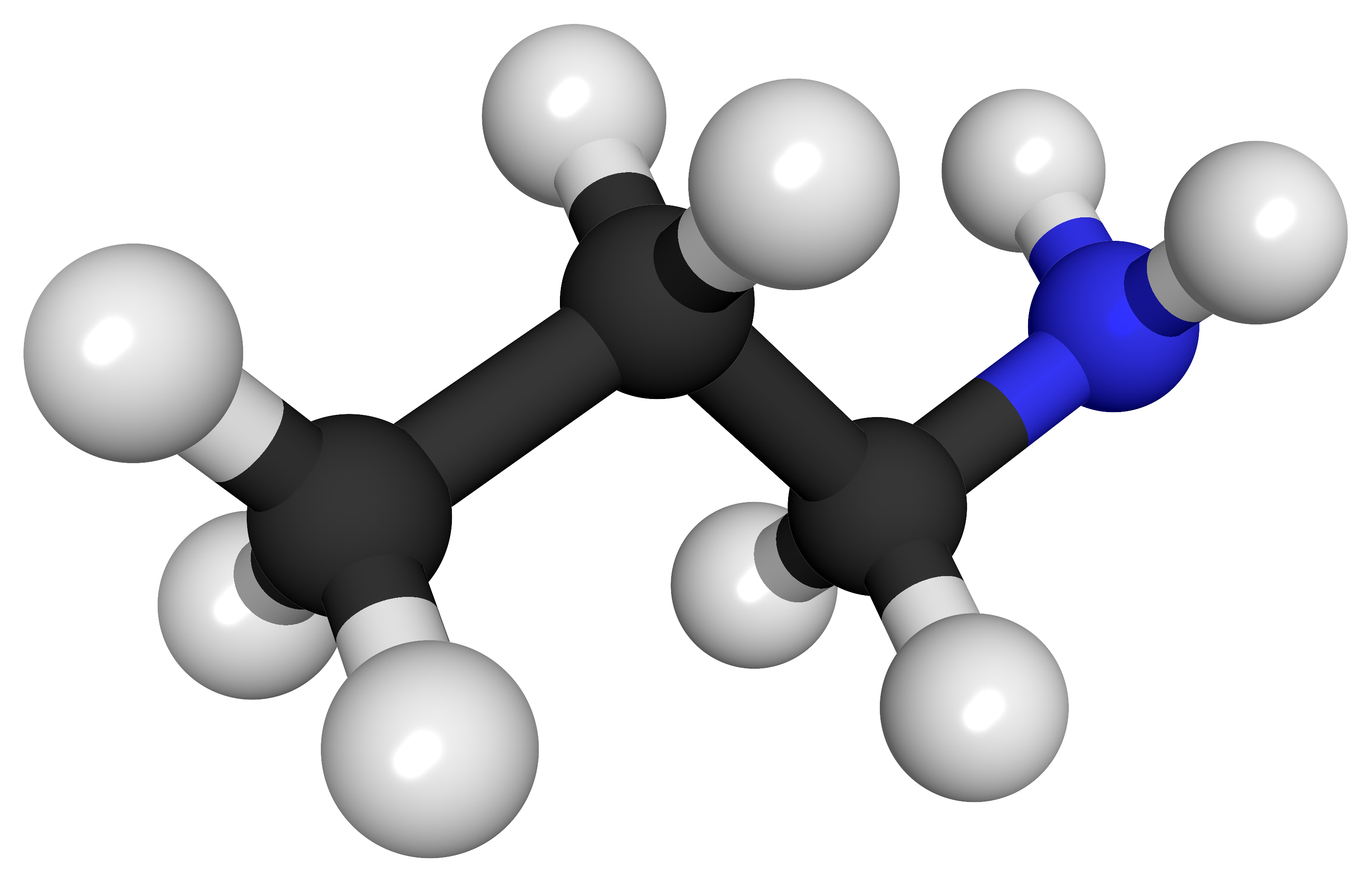
- Ball and stick model of propylamine

Names
- Preferred IUPAC name Propan-1-amine
- Other names Propylamine

Identifiers
CAS Number	107-10-8
3D model (JSmol)	Interactive image
Abbreviations	PrNH_{2} n-PrNH_{2} nPrNH_{2}^{n}PrNH_{2}
Beilstein Reference	1098243
ChEBI	CHEBI:39870
ChEMBL	ChEMBL14409
ChemSpider	7564
ECHA InfoCard	100.003.149
EC Number	203-462-3
Gmelin Reference	1529
PubChem CID	7852
RTECS number	UH9100000
UNII	I76F18D635
UN number	1277
CompTox Dashboard (EPA)	DTXSID6021878
- InChI: InChI=1S/C3H9N/c1-2-3-4/h2-4H2,1H3 Key: WGYKZJWCGVVSQN-UHFFFAOYSA-N
- SMILES: CCCN

Properties
Chemical formula	C_{3}H_{9}N
Molar mass	59.112 g·mol^{−1}
Appearance	Colorless liquid
Odor	fishy, ammoniacal
Density	0.719 g mL^{−1}
Melting point	−83.00 °C; −117.40 °F; 190.15 K
Boiling point	47 to 51 °C; 116 to 124 °F; 320 to 324 K
Solubility in water	Miscible
log P	0.547
Vapor pressure	33.01 kPa (at 20 °C)
Henry's law constant (k_{H})	660 μmol Pa^{−1} kg^{−1}
Acidity (pK_{a})	10.71
Refractive index (n_{D})	1.388

Thermochemistry
Heat capacity (C)	162.51 J K^{−1} mol^{−1}
Std molar entropy (S^{⦵}_{298})	227.44 J K^{−1} mol^{−1}
Std enthalpy of formation (Δ_{f}H^{⦵}_{298})	−101.9–−101.1 kJ mol^{−1}
Std enthalpy of combustion (Δ_{c}H^{⦵}_{298})	−2.368–−2.362 MJ mol^{−1}

Hazards
- GHS labelling
Pictograms	(GHS02: Flammable) (GHS05: Corrosive) (GHS06: Toxic)
Signal word	Danger
Hazard statements	H225, H302, H311, H314, H331
Precautionary statements	P210, P261, P280, P305+P351+P338, P310
Flash point	−30 °C (−22 °F; 243 K)
Explosive limits	2–10.4%
- Lethal dose or concentration (LD, LC)
LD_{50} (median dose)	370 mg kg^{−1} (oral, rat); 402.6 mg kg^{−1} (dermal, rabbit)

Related compounds
Related alkanamines	Ethylamine; Ethylenediamine; Isopropylamine; 1,2-Diaminopropane; 1,3-Diaminopropane; Isobutylamine; tert-Butylamine; n-Butylamine; sec-Butylamine; Putrescine
- Except where otherwise noted, data are given for materials in their standard state (at 25 °C [77 °F], 100 kPa). verify (what is ?) Infobox references

Propylamine, also known as n-propylamine, is an amine with the chemical formula CH_{3}(CH_{2})_{2}NH_{2}. It is a colorless volatile liquid.

Propylamine is a weak base. Its K_{b} (base dissociation constant) is 4.7 × 10^{−4}.

== Preparation ==
Propyl amine hydrochloride can be prepared by reacting 1-propanol with ammonium chloride at high temperature and pressure using a Lewis acid catalyst such as ferric chloride.
