= Isobutylamine =

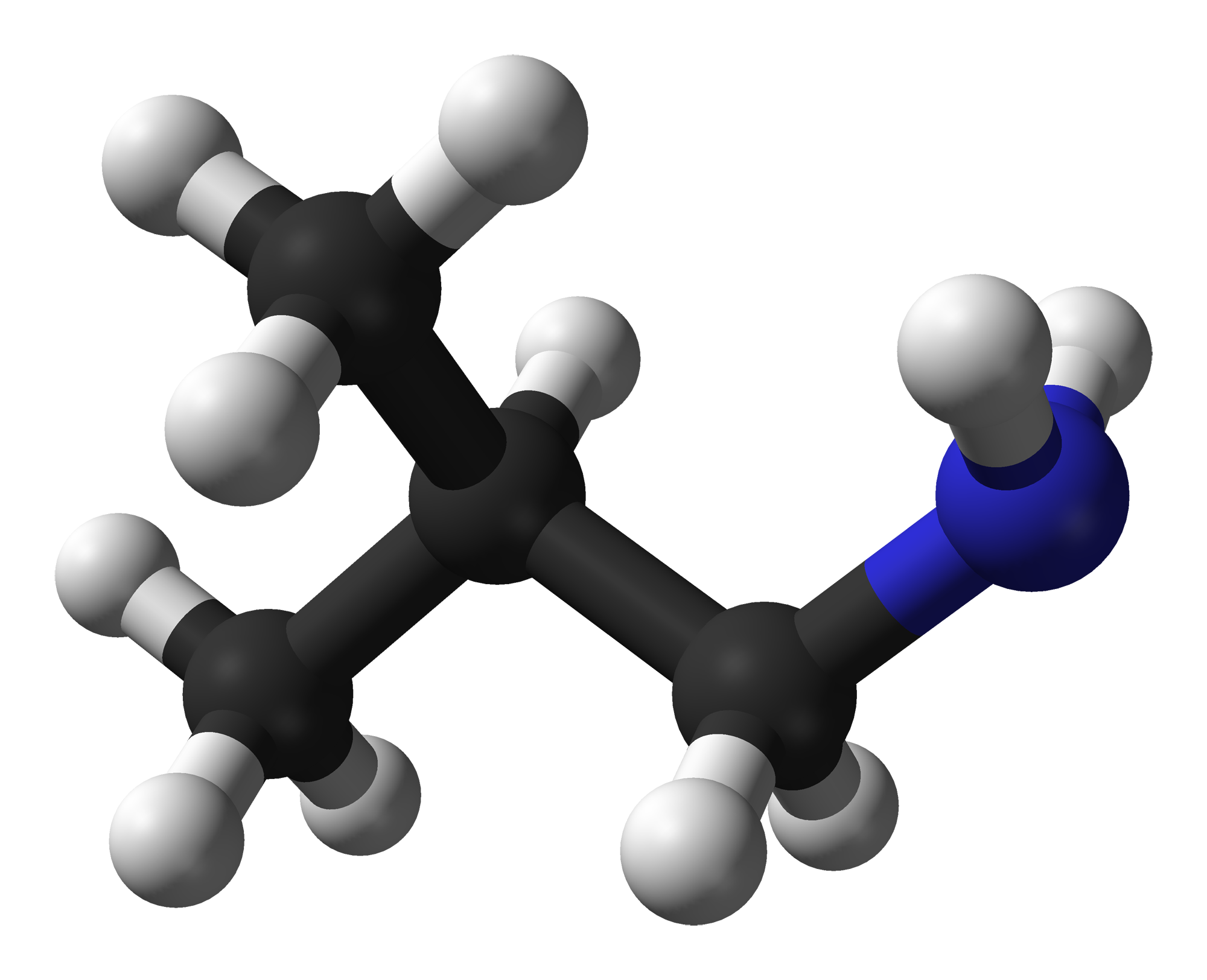
- Skeletal formula of isobutylamine

Names
- Preferred IUPAC name 2-Methylpropan-1-amine
- Other names (2-Methylpropyl)amine

Identifiers
CAS Number	78-81-9
3D model (JSmol)	Interactive image
Abbreviations	i-BuNH_{2} iBuNH_{2}^{i}BuNH_{2}
Beilstein Reference	385626
ChEBI	CHEBI:15997
ChemSpider	6310
ECHA InfoCard	100.001.042
EC Number	201-145-4
Gmelin Reference	81862
KEGG	C02787
MeSH	isobutylamine
PubChem CID	6558
RTECS number	NP9900000
UNII	1H60H4LOHZ
UN number	1214
CompTox Dashboard (EPA)	DTXSID9025459
- InChI: InChI=1S/C4H11N/c1-4(2)3-5/h4H,3,5H2,1-2H3 Key: KDSNLYIMUZNERS-UHFFFAOYSA-N
- SMILES: CC(C)CN

Properties
Chemical formula	C_{4}H_{11}N
Molar mass	73.139 g·mol^{−1}
Appearance	Colorless liquid
Odor	Fishy, ammoniacal
Density	736 mg mL^{−1}
Melting point	−86.6 °C; −124.0 °F; 186.5 K
Boiling point	67 to 69 °C; 152 to 156 °F; 340 to 342 K
Solubility in water	Miscible
Magnetic susceptibility (χ)	−59.8·10^{−6} cm^{3}/mol
Refractive index (n_{D})	1.397
Viscosity	500 μPa s (at 20 °C)

Thermochemistry
Heat capacity (C)	194 J K^{−1} mol^{−1}
Std enthalpy of formation (Δ_{f}H^{⦵}_{298})	−133.0 – −132.0 kJ mol^{−1}
Std enthalpy of combustion (Δ_{c}H^{⦵}_{298})	−3.0139 – −3.0131 MJ mol^{−1}

Hazards
- GHS labelling
Pictograms	(GHS02: Flammable) (GHS05: Corrosive) (GHS06: Toxic)
Signal word	Danger
Hazard statements	H225, H301, H314
Precautionary statements	P210, P280, P301+P310, P305+P351+P338, P310
Flash point	−9 °C (16 °F; 264 K)
- Lethal dose or concentration (LD, LC)
LD_{50} (median dose)	224 mg kg^{−1} (oral, rat)

Related compounds
Related alkanamines	Ethylamine; Ethylenediamine; Propylamine; Isopropylamine; 1,2-Diaminopropane; 1,3-Diaminopropane; tert-Butylamine; n-Butylamine; sec-Butylamine; Putrescine
Related compounds	2-Methyl-2-nitrosopropane; N-Methylisobutylamine
- Except where otherwise noted, data are given for materials in their standard state (at 25 °C [77 °F], 100 kPa). verify (what is ?) Infobox references

Isobutylamine is an organic chemical compound (specifically, an amine) with the formula (CH_{3})_{2}CHCH_{2}NH_{2}, and occurs as a colorless liquid. Isobutylamine is one of the four isomeric amines of butane, the others being n-butylamine, sec-butylamine and tert-butylamine. It is the decarboxylated form of the amino acid valine, and the product of the metabolism thereof by the enzyme valine decarboxylase.

== Production ==
Isobutylamine can be obtained by reaction of isobutanol with ammonia in presence of a catalyst:

$$\ce{(CH3)2CHCH2OH + NH3 -> (CH3)2CHCH2NH2 + H2O}$$

Isobutylamine can also be produced from the reaction of Isobutyl chloride with ammonia:

$$\ce{(CH3)2CHCH2Cl + NH3 -> (CH3)2CHCH2NH2 + HCl}$$

A alternative method of producing Isobutylamine is the decarboxylation of Valine with the enzyme Valine decarboxylase or the thermal decarboxylation:

$$\ce{H2NCH(CH(CH3)2)COOH -> (CH3)2CHCH2NH2 + CO2}$$

== Uses ==
Isobutylamine is an odorant binding to TAAR3 in mice and can trigger sexual behaviour in male mice dependent on the cluster of TAAR2 through TAAR9.
