= Ethylenediamine =

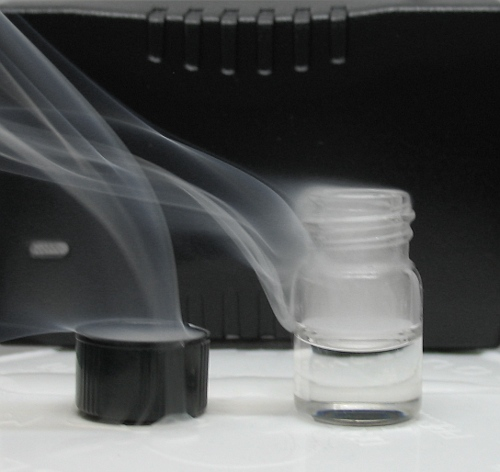

- Skeletal formula of ethylenediamine

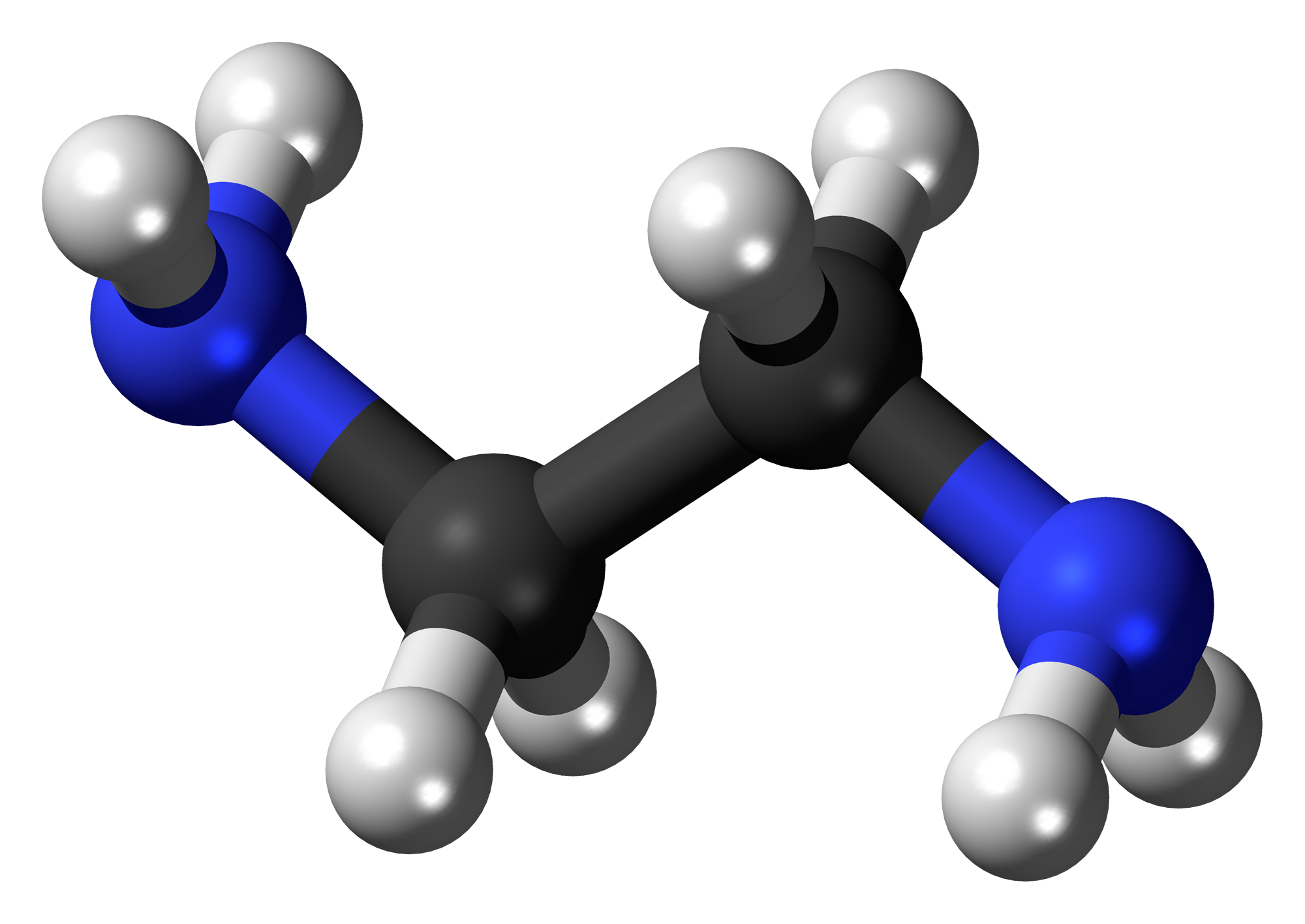
Ball and stick model of ethylenediamine
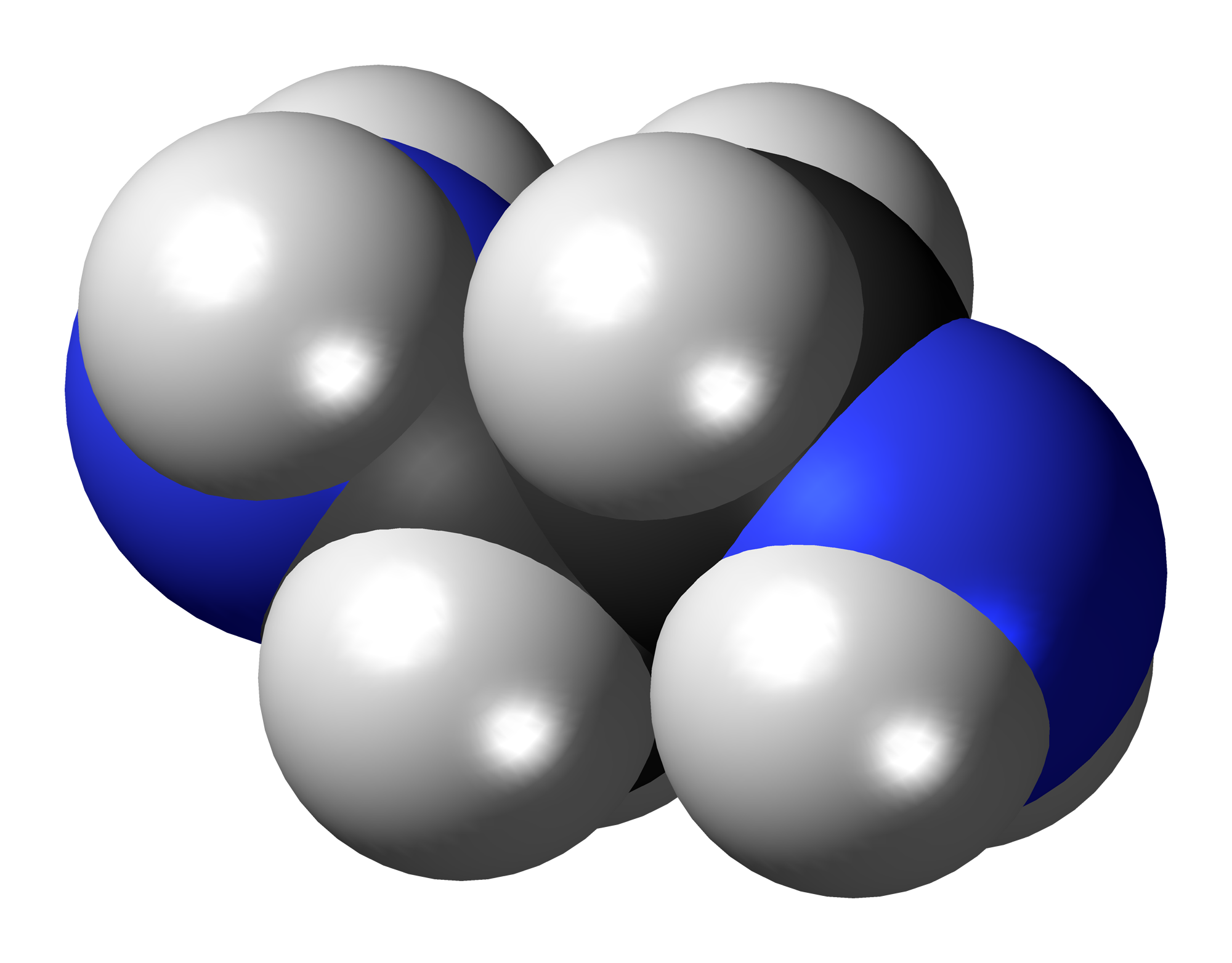
Space-filling model of ethylenediamine

Names
- Preferred IUPAC name Ethane-1,2-diamine
- Other names Edamine, 1,2-Diaminoethane, 'en' when a ligand

Identifiers
CAS Number	107-15-3
3D model (JSmol)	Interactive image
Abbreviations	en
Beilstein Reference	605263
ChEBI	CHEBI:30347
ChEMBL	ChEMBL816
ChemSpider	13835550
ECHA InfoCard	100.003.154
EC Number	203-468-6
Gmelin Reference	1098
KEGG	D01114
MeSH	ethylenediamine
PubChem CID	3301
RTECS number	KH8575000
UNII	60V9STC53F
UN number	1604
CompTox Dashboard (EPA)	DTXSID5021881
- InChI: InChI=1S/C2H8N2/c3-1-2-4/h1-4H2 Key: PIICEJLVQHRZGT-UHFFFAOYSA-N
- SMILES: NCCN

Properties
Chemical formula	C_{2}H_{8}N_{2}
Molar mass	60.100 g·mol^{−1}
Appearance	Colorless liquid
Odor	Ammoniacal
Density	0.90 g/cm^{3}
Melting point	8 °C (46 °F; 281 K)
Boiling point	116 °C (241 °F; 389 K)
Solubility in water	miscible
log P	−2.057
Vapor pressure	1.3 kPa (at 20 °C)
Henry's law constant (k_{H})	5.8 mol Pa^{−1} kg^{−1}
Magnetic susceptibility (χ)	−46.26×10^{−6} cm^{3} mol^{−1}; −76.2×10^{−6} cm^{3} mol^{−1} (HCl salt)
Refractive index (n_{D})	1.4565

Thermochemistry
Heat capacity (C)	172.59 J K^{−1} mol^{−1}
Std molar entropy (S^{⦵}_{298})	202.42 J K^{−1} mol^{−1}
Std enthalpy of formation (Δ_{f}H^{⦵}_{298})	−63.55 to −62.47 kJ mol^{−1}
Std enthalpy of combustion (Δ_{c}H^{⦵}_{298})	−1.8678 to −1.8668 MJ mol^{−1}

Hazards
- GHS labelling
Pictograms	(GHS02: Flammable) (GHS06: Toxic) (GHS05: Corrosive) (GHS08: Health hazard)
Signal word	Danger
Hazard statements	H226, H302, H311, H314, H317, H332, H334, H412
Precautionary statements	P101, P102, P260, P273, P280, P305+P351+P338, P308+P313, P405, P501
NFPA 704 (fire diamond)	3 2 0
Flash point	34 °C (93 °F; 307 K)
Autoignition temperature	385 °C (725 °F; 658 K)
Explosive limits	2.7–16%
- Lethal dose or concentration (LD, LC)
LD_{50} (median dose)	500 mg/kg (oral, rat); 470 mg/kg (oral, guinea pig); 1160 mg/kg (oral, rat)
- NIOSH (US health exposure limits)
PEL (Permissible)	TWA 10 ppm (25 mg/m^{3})
REL (Recommended)	TWA 10 ppm (25 mg/m^{3})
IDLH (Immediate danger)	1000 ppm

Related compounds
Related alkanamines	1,2-Diaminopropane, 1,3-Diaminopropane
Related compounds	Ethylamine, Ethylenedinitramine
- Except where otherwise noted, data are given for materials in their standard state (at 25 °C [77 °F], 100 kPa). verify (what is ?) Infobox references

Ethylenediamine (abbreviated as en when a ligand) is the organic compound with the formula C_{2}H_{4}(NH_{2})_{2}. This colorless liquid with an ammonia-like odor is a basic amine. It is a widely used building block in chemical synthesis, with approximately 500,000 tonnes produced in 1998. Ethylenediamine is the first member of the so-called polyethylene amines.

== Synthesis ==
Ethylenediamine is produced industrially by treating 1,2-dichloroethane with ammonia under pressure at 180 °C in an aqueous medium (EDC process):

In this reaction hydrogen chloride is generated, which forms a salt with the amine. The amine is liberated by addition of sodium hydroxide and can then be recovered by fractional distillation. Diethylenetriamine (DETA) and triethylenetetramine (TETA) are formed as by-products.

Another industrial route to ethylenediamine involves the reaction of ethanolamine and ammonia:

This process involves passing the gaseous reactants over a bed of nickel heterogeneous catalysts.

It can be prepared in the lab by the reaction of either ethylene glycol or ethanolamine and urea, followed by decarboxylation of the ethyleneurea intermediate.

Ethylenediamine can be purified by treatment with sodium hydroxide to remove water followed by distillation.

== Applications ==
Ethylenediamine is used in large quantities for production of many industrial chemicals. It forms derivatives with carboxylic acids (including fatty acids), nitriles, alcohols (at elevated temperatures), alkylating agents, carbon disulfide, and aldehydes and ketones. Because of its bifunctional nature, having two amino groups, it readily forms heterocycles such as imidazolidines.

=== Precursor to chelation agents, drugs, and agrochemicals ===
A most prominent derivative of ethylenediamine is the chelating agent EDTA, which is derived from ethylenediamine via a Strecker synthesis involving cyanide and formaldehyde. Hydroxyethylethylenediamine is another commercially significant chelating agent. Numerous bio-active compounds and drugs contain the N-CH_{2}-CH_{2}-N linkage, including some antihistamines. Salts of ethylenebisdithiocarbamate are commercially significant fungicides under the brand names Maneb, Mancozeb, Zineb, and Metiram. Some imidazoline-containing fungicides are derived from ethylenediamine.

=== Pharmaceutical ingredient ===
Ethylenediamine is an ingredient in the common bronchodilator drug aminophylline, where it serves to solubilize the active ingredient theophylline. Ethylenediamine has also been used in dermatologic preparations, but has been removed from some because of causing contact dermatitis. When used as a pharmaceutical excipient, after oral administration its bioavailability is about 0.34, due to a substantial first-pass effect. Less than 20% is eliminated by renal excretion.

Ethylenediamine-derived antihistamines are the oldest of the five classes of first-generation antihistamines, beginning with piperoxan aka benodain, discovered in 1933 at the Pasteur Institute in France, and also including mepyramine, tripelennamine, and antazoline. The other classes are derivatives of ethanolamine, alkylamine, piperazine, and others (primarily tricyclic and tetracyclic compounds related to phenothiazines, tricyclic antidepressants, as well as the cyproheptadine-phenindamine family)

=== Role in polymers ===
Ethylenediamine, because it contains two amine groups, is a widely used precursor to various polymers. Condensates derived from formaldehyde are plasticizers. It is widely used in the production of polyurethane fibers. The PAMAM class of dendrimers are derived from ethylenediamine.

=== Tetraacetylethylenediamine ===
The bleaching activator tetraacetylethylenediamine is generated from ethylenediamine. The derivative N,N-ethylenebis(stearamide) (EBS) is a commercially significant mold-release agent and a surfactant in gasoline and motor oil.

=== Other applications ===
- as a solvent, it is miscible with polar solvents and is used to solubilize proteins such as albumins and casein. It is also used in certain electroplating baths.
- as a corrosion inhibitor in paints and coolants.
- ethylenediamine dihydroiodide (EDDI) is added to animal feeds as a source of iodide.
- chemicals for color photography developing, binders, adhesives, fabric softeners, curing agents for epoxies, and dyes.
- as a compound to sensitize nitromethane into an explosive. This mixture was used at Picatinny Arsenal during World War II, giving the nitromethane and ethylenediamine mixture the nickname PLX, or Picatinny Liquid Explosive.

== Coordination chemistry ==
Ethylenediamine is a well-known bidentate chelating ligand for coordination compounds, with the two nitrogen atoms donating their lone pairs of electrons when ethylenediamine acts as a ligand. It is often abbreviated "en" in inorganic chemistry. The complex [Co(en)_{3}]^{3+} is a well studied example. Schiff base ligands easily form from ethylenediamine. For example, the diamine condenses with 4-Trifluoromethylbenzaldehyde to give to the diimine. The salen ligands, some of which are used in catalysis, are derived from the condensation of salicylaldehydes and ethylenediamine.

=== Related ligands ===
Related derivatives of ethylenediamine include ethylenediaminetetraacetic acid (EDTA), tetramethylethylenediamine (TMEDA), and tetraethylethylenediamine (TEEDA). Chiral analogs of ethylenediamine include 1,2-diaminopropane and trans-diaminocyclohexane.

== Safety ==
Ethylenediamine, like ammonia and other low-molecular weight amines, is a skin and respiratory irritant. Unless tightly contained, liquid ethylenediamine will release toxic and irritating vapors into its surroundings, especially on heating. The vapors absorb moisture from humid air to form a characteristic white mist, which is extremely irritating to skin, eyes, lungs and mucous membranes.
