= Weak base =

Base that does not associate completely with hydrogen ions

A weak base is a base that does not accept all the available H^{+} ions, and forms an equilibrium between the base and its conjugate acid. Upon dissolution in water, a weak base does not dissociate completely, so that the resulting aqueous solution contains only a small proportion of hydroxide ions and the concerned basic radical, and a large proportion of undissociated molecules of the base.

== pH, K_{b}, and K_{w} ==
Bases yield solutions in which the hydrogen ion activity is lower than it is in pure water, i.e., the solution is said to have a pH greater than 7.0 at standard conditions, potentially as high as 14 (and even greater than 14 for some bases). The formula for pH is:

$$\mbox{pH} = -\log_{10} \left[ \mbox{H}^+ \right]$$

Bases are proton acceptors; a base will receive a hydrogen ion from water, H_{2}O, and the remaining H^{+} concentration in the solution determines pH. A weak base will have a higher H^{+} concentration than a stronger base because it is less completely protonated than a stronger base and, therefore, more hydrogen ions remain in its solution. Given its greater H^{+} concentration, the formula yields a lower pH value for the weak base. However, pH of bases is usually calculated in terms of the OH^{−} concentration. This is done because the H^{+} concentration is not a part of the reaction, whereas the OH^{−} concentration is. The pOH is defined as:

$$\mbox{pOH} = -\log_{10} \left[ \mbox{OH}^- \right]$$

If we multiply the equilibrium constants of a conjugate acid (such as NH_{4}^{+}) and a conjugate base (such as NH_{3}) we obtain:

$$K_a \times K_b = {[H_3O^+] [NH_3]\over[NH_4^+]} \times {[NH_4^+] [OH^-]\over[NH_3]} = [H_3O^+] [OH^-]$$

As ${K_w} = [H_3O^+] [OH^-]$ is just the self-ionization constant of water, we have $K_a \times K_b = K_w$

Taking the logarithm of both sides of the equation yields:

$$logK_a + logK_b = logK_w$$

Finally, multiplying both sides by -1, we obtain:

$$pK_a + pK_b = pK_w = 14.00$$

With pOH obtained from the pOH formula given above, the pH of the base can then be calculated from $pH = pK_w - pOH$, where pK_{w} = 14.00.

A weak base persists in chemical equilibrium in much the same way as a weak acid does, with a base dissociation constant (K_{b}) indicating the strength of the base. For example, when ammonia is put in water, the following equilibrium is set up:

$$\mathrm{K_b={[NH_4^+] [OH^-]\over[NH_3]}}$$

A base that has a large K_{b} will ionize more completely and is thus a stronger base. As shown above, the pH of the solution, which depends on the H^{+} concentration, increases with increasing OH^{−} concentration; a greater OH^{−} concentration means a smaller H^{+} concentration, therefore a greater pH. Strong bases have smaller H^{+} concentrations because they are more fully protonated, leaving fewer hydrogen ions in the solution. A smaller H^{+} concentration means a greater OH^{−} concentration and, therefore, a greater K_{b} and a greater pH.

NaOH (s) (sodium hydroxide) is a stronger base than (CH_{3}CH_{2})_{2}NH (l) (diethylamine) which is a stronger base than NH_{3} (g) (ammonia). As the bases get weaker, the smaller the K_{b} values become.

== Percentage protonated ==
As seen above, the strength of a base depends primarily on pH. To help describe the strengths of weak bases, it is helpful to know the percentage protonated-the percentage of base molecules that have been protonated. A lower percentage will correspond with a lower pH because both numbers result from the amount of protonation. A weak base is less protonated, leading to a lower pH and a lower percentage protonated.

The typical proton transfer equilibrium appears as such:

$$B(aq) + H_2O(l) \leftrightarrow HB^+(aq) + OH^-(aq)$$

B represents the base.

$$Percentage\ protonated = {molarity\ of\ HB^+ \over\ initial\ molarity\ of\ B} \times 100\% = {[{HB}^+]\over [B]_{initial}} {\times 100\%}$$

In this formula, [B]_{initial} is the initial molar concentration of the base, assuming that no protonation has occurred.

== A typical pH problem ==
Calculate the pH and percentage protonation of a .20 M aqueous solution of pyridine, C_{5}H_{5}N. The K_{b} for C_{5}H_{5}N is 1.8 x 10^{−9}.

First, write the proton transfer equilibrium:

$$\mathrm{H_2O(l) + C_5H_5N(aq) \leftrightarrow C_5H_5NH^+ (aq) + OH^- (aq)}$$

$$K_b=\mathrm{[C_5H_5NH^+] [OH^-]\over [C_5H_5N]}$$

The equilibrium table, with all concentrations in moles per liter, is

	C_{5}H_{5}N	C_{5}H_{6}N^{+}	OH^{−}
initial normality	.20	0	0
change in normality	−x	+x	+x
equilibrium normality	.20 − x	x	x

Substitute the equilibrium molarities into the basicity constant	$K_b=\mathrm {1.8 \times 10^{-9}} = {x \times x \over .20-x}$
We can assume that x is so small that it will be meaningless by the time we use significant figures.	${1.8 \times 10^{-9}} \approx {x^2 \over .20}$
Solve for x.	$x \approx \sqrt{.20 \times (1.8 \times 10^{-9})} = 1.9 \times 10^{-5}$
Check the assumption that x ≪ .20	$\mathrm 1.9 \times 10^{-5} \ll .20$; so the approximation is valid
Find pOH from pOH = −log [OH^{−}] with [OH^{−}] = x	$\mathrm{pOH} \approx -\log(1.9 \times 10^{-5}) = 4.7$
From pH = pK_{w} − pOH,	$\mathrm{pH} \approx 14.00 - 4.7 = 9.3$
From the equation for percentage protonated with [HB^{+}] = x and [B]_{initial} = .20,	$\mathrm{percentage \ protonated} = {1.9 \times 10^{-5} \over .20} \times 100\% = .0095\%$

This means .0095% of the pyridine is in the protonated form of C_{5}H_{5}NH^{+}.

== Examples ==
- Alanine
- Ammonia, NH_{3}
- Methylamine, CH_{3}NH_{2}
- Ammonium hydroxide, NH_{4}OH

== Simple Facts ==
- An example of a weak base is ammonia. It does not contain hydroxide ions, but it reacts with water to produce ammonium ions and hydroxide ions.
- The position of equilibrium varies from base to base when a weak base reacts with water. The further to the left it is, the weaker the base.
- When there is a hydrogen ion gradient between two sides of the biological membrane, the concentration of some weak bases are focused on only one side of the membrane. Weak bases tend to build up in acidic fluids. Acid gastric contains a higher concentration of weak base than plasma. Acid urine, compared to alkaline urine, excretes weak bases at a faster rate.

== See also ==
- Strong base
- Weak acid
