= Putrescine =

Foul-smelling organic chemical compound

- Skeletal formula of putrescine Skeletal formula

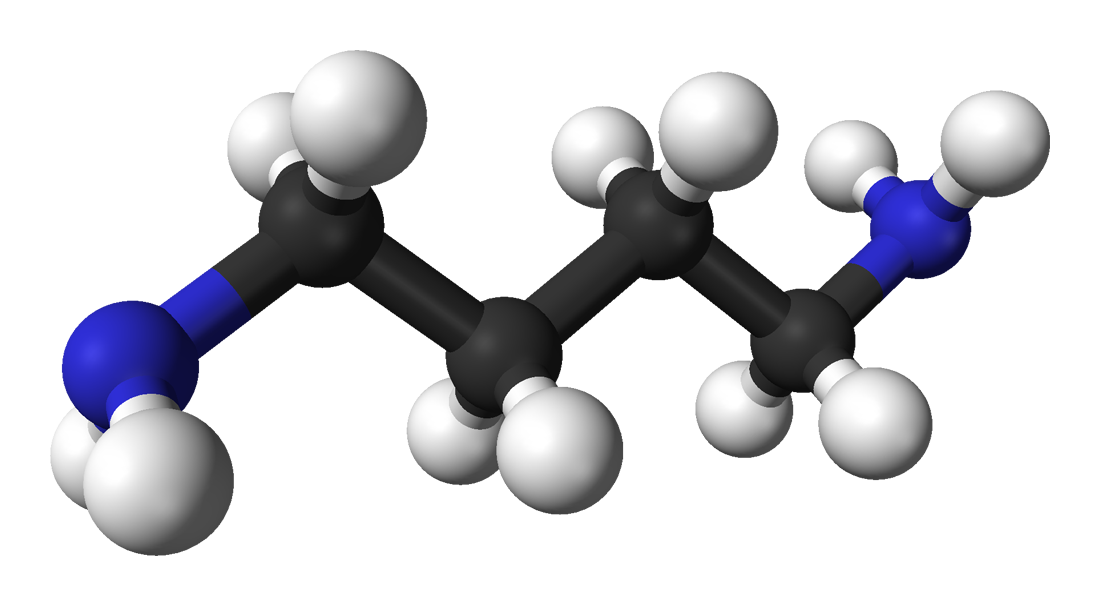
- Ball and stick model of putrescine Ball-and-stick model

Names
- Preferred IUPAC name Butane-1,4-diamine
- Other names 1,4-Diaminobutane, 1,4-Butanediamine

Identifiers
CAS Number	110-60-1
3D model (JSmol)	Interactive image
Beilstein Reference	605282
ChEBI	CHEBI:17148
ChEMBL	ChEMBL46257
ChemSpider	13837702
DrugBank	DB01917
ECHA InfoCard	100.003.440
EC Number	203-782-3
Gmelin Reference	1715
IUPHAR/BPS	2388
KEGG	C00134
MeSH	Putrescine
PubChem CID	1045
RTECS number	EJ6800000
UNII	V10TVZ52E4
UN number	2928
CompTox Dashboard (EPA)	DTXSID4041107
- InChI: InChI=1S/C4H12N2/c5-3-1-2-4-6/h1-6H2 Key: KIDHWZJUCRJVML-UHFFFAOYSA-N
- SMILES: NCCCCN

Properties
Chemical formula	C_{4}H_{12}N_{2}
Molar mass	88.154 g·mol^{−1}
Appearance	Colourless crystals
Odor	very unpleasant; putrid, fishy-ammoniacal
Density	0.877 g/mL
Melting point	27.5 °C (81.5 °F; 300.6 K)
Boiling point	158.6 °C; 317.4 °F; 431.7 K
Solubility in water	Miscible
log P	−0.466
Vapor pressure	2.33 mm Hg at 25 °C (est)
Henry's law constant (k_{H})	3.54×10^{−10} atm·m^{3}/mol at 25 °C (est)
Refractive index (n_{D})	1.457

Hazards
- GHS labelling
Pictograms	(GHS02: Flammable) (GHS05: Corrosive) (GHS06: Toxic)
Signal word	Danger
Hazard statements	H228, H302, H312, H314, H331
Precautionary statements	P210, P261, P280, P305+P351+P338, P310
Flash point	51 °C (124 °F; 324 K)
Explosive limits	0.98–9.08%
- Lethal dose or concentration (LD, LC)
LD_{50} (median dose)	463 mg kg^{−1} (oral, rat); 1.576 g kg^{−1} (dermal, rabbit)

Related compounds
Related alkanamines	Propylamine; Isopropylamine; 1,2-Diaminopropane; 1,3-Diaminopropane; Isobutylamine; tert-Butylamine; n-Butylamine; sec-Butylamine; 1-Aminopentane; Cadaverine
Related compounds	2-Methyl-2-nitrosopropane; Nylon 46
- Except where otherwise noted, data are given for materials in their standard state (at 25 °C [77 °F], 100 kPa). verify (what is ?) Infobox references

Putrescine is an organic compound with the formula (CH_{2})_{4}(NH_{2})_{2}. It is a colorless solid that melts near room temperature. It is classified as a diamine. Together with cadaverine, it is largely responsible for the foul odor of putrefying flesh, but also contributes to other unpleasant odors.

== Production ==
Putrescine is produced on an industrial scale by the hydrogenation of succinonitrile.

Biotechnological production of putrescine from a renewable feedstock has been investigated. A metabolically engineered strain of Escherichia coli that produces putrescine at high concentrations in glucose mineral salts medium has been described.

== Biochemistry ==
Biosynthesis of spermidine and spermine from putrescine. Ado = 5'-adenosyl.

Spermidine synthase uses putrescine and S-adenosylmethioninamine (decarboxylated S-adenosyl methionine) to produce spermidine. Spermidine in turn is combined with another S-adenosylmethioninamine and gets converted to spermine.

Putrescine is synthesized in small quantities by healthy living cells by the action of ornithine decarboxylase.

Putrescine is synthesized biologically via two different pathways, both starting from arginine.

- In one pathway, arginine is converted into agmatine. The conversion is catalyzed by the enzyme arginine decarboxylase (ADC). Agmatine is transformed into N-carbamoylputrescine by agmatine imino hydroxylase (AIH). Finally, N-carbamoylputrescine is hydrolyzed to give putrescine.
- In the second pathway, arginine is converted into ornithine and then ornithine is converted into putrescine by ornithine decarboxylase (ODC).

Putrescine, via metabolic intermediates including N-acetylputrescine, γ-aminobutyraldehyde (GABAL), N-acetyl-γ-aminobutyric acid (N-acetyl-GABAL), and N-acetyl-γ-aminobutyric acid (N-acetyl-GABA), biotransformations mediated by diamine oxidase (DAO), monoamine oxidase B (MAO-B), aminobutyraldehyde dehydrogenase (ABALDH), and other enzymes, can act as a minor biological precursor of γ-aminobutyric acid (GABA) in the brain and elsewhere. In 2021, it was discovered that MAO-B does not mediate dopamine catabolism in the rodent striatum but instead participates in striatal GABA synthesis and that synthesized GABA in turn inhibits dopaminergic neurons in this brain area. It has been found that MAO-B, via the putrescine pathway, importantly mediates GABA synthesis in astrocytes in various brain areas, including in the hippocampus, cerebellum, striatum, cerebral cortex, and substantia nigra pars compacta (SNpc).

== Occurrence ==
Putrescine is found in all organisms.

=== Plants ===
Putrescine is widely found in plant tissues, often being the most common polyamine present within the organism. Its role in development is well documented, but recent studies have suggested that putrescine also plays a role in stress responses in plants, both to biotic and abiotic stressors. The absence of putrescine in plants is associated with an increase in both parasite and fungal population in plants.

Putrescine serves an important role in a multitude of ways, which include: a cation substitute, an osmolyte, or a transport protein. It also serves as an important regulator in a variety of surface proteins, both on the cell surface and on organelles, such as the mitochondria and chloroplasts. A recorded increase of ATP production has been found in mitochondria and ATP synthesis by chloroplasts with an increase in mitochondrial and chloroplastic putrescine, but putrescine has also been shown to function as a developmental inhibitor in some plants, which can be seen as dwarfism and late flowering in Arabidopsis plants.

==== Soil fungi ====
Putrescine production in plants can also be promoted by fungi in the soil. Piriformospora indica (P. indica) is one such fungus, found to promote putrescine production in Arabidopsis and common garden tomato plants. In a 2022 study it was shown that the presence of this fungus had a promotional effect on the growth of the root structure of plants. After gas chromatography testing, putrescine was found in higher amounts in these root structures.

Plants that had been inoculated with P. indica had presented an excess of arginine decarboxylase. This is used in the process of making putrescine in plant cells. One of the downstream effects of putrescine in root cells is the production of auxin. That same study found that putrescine added as a fertilizer showed the same results as if it was inoculated with the fungus, which was also shown in Arabidopsis and barley. The evolutionary foundations of this connection and putrescine are still unclear.

=== Animals ===
Putrescine is a component of bad breath and bacterial vaginosis. It is also found in semen and some microalgae, together with spermine and spermidine.

== Uses ==
Putrescine reacts with adipic acid to yield the polyamide nylon 46, which is marketed by Envalior (formerly DSM) under the trade name Stanyl.

Due to its role in putrification, putrescine has also been proposed as a biochemical marker for determining how long a corpse has been decomposing.

=== Agriculture ===
Applying polyamines such as putrescine (PUT) to a plant causes lowered ethylene production. When applied pre-harvest, it increases plant resistance to high temperatures and drought.

When applied post-harvest (to the fruits), PUT delays the ripening process and extends the shelf life. It is known to be applicable to a wide variety of fruits, including but not limited to peach, plum, cherry, tomato, and pear. It is also applicable to other edible parts such as broccoli. PUT has an all-round effect: it delays the deterioration of appearance (weight [mainly water] loss, % of rotten fruits, firmness), taste (total soluble solids, titratable acidity, organic acid content), and nutrition (phenol content, antioxidant content).

A nanoparticle of putrescine coated with chitosan has been used as an edible coating on strawberries. Like regular putrescine treatment, treated fruits had higher antioxidant capacity, higher enzyme activities, higher tissue firmness, and higher total soluble solids. It extends the post-harvest life of strawberries during storage up to 12 days.

== History ==
Putrescine and cadaverine were first described in 1885 by the Berlin physician Ludwig Brieger (1849–1919).

== Toxicity ==
In rats, putrescine has a low acute oral toxicity of 2000 mg/kg body weight, with no-observed-adverse-effect level of 2000 ppm (180 mg/kg body weight/day).
