= Tert-Butylamine =

tert-Butylamine
Skeletal formula of tert-butylamine
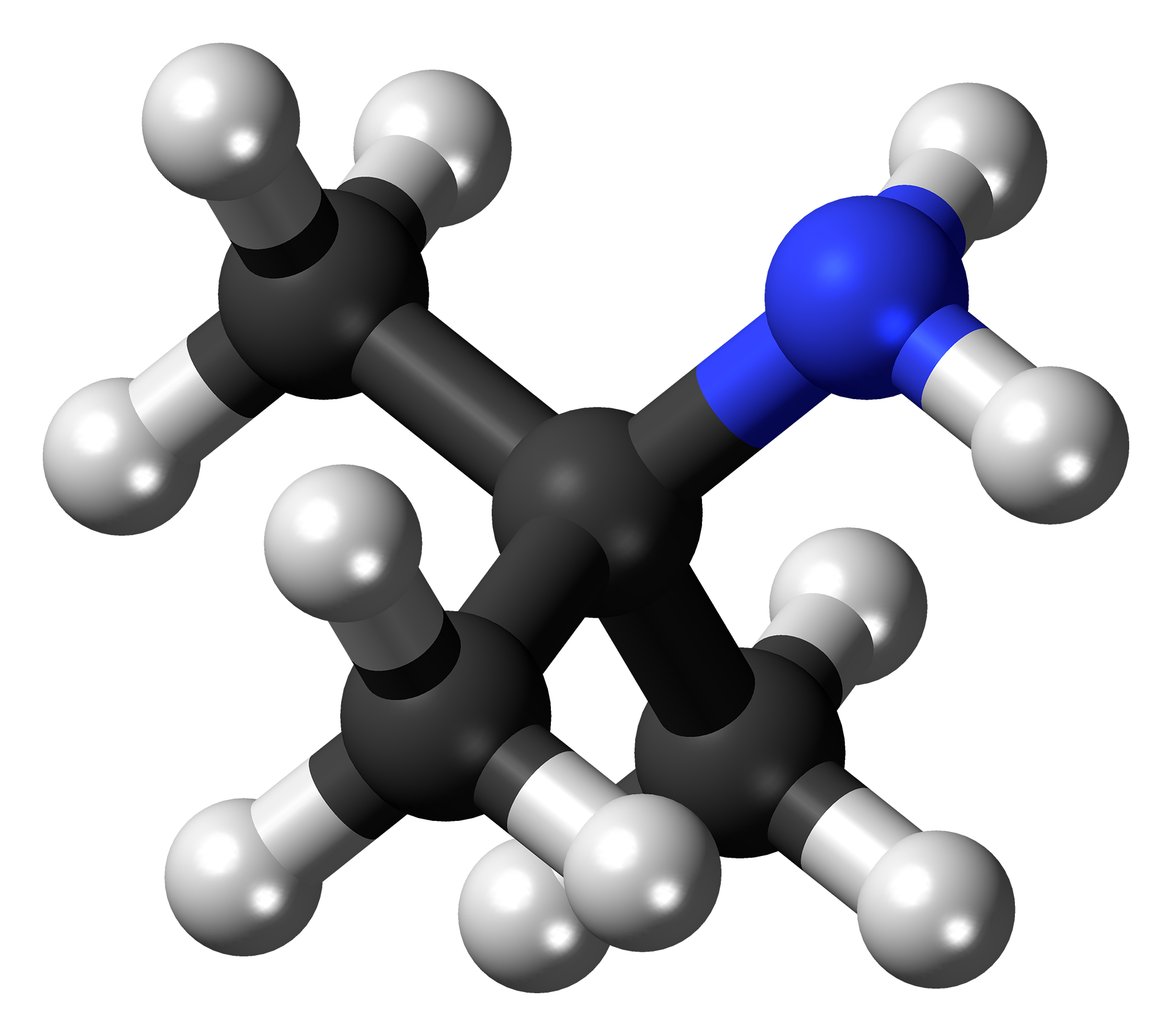

Names
- Preferred IUPAC name 2-Methylpropan-2-amine
- Other names: 2-Aminoisobutane; 2-Amino-2-methylpropane; Dimethylethylamine; 2-Methyl-2-aminopropane; 2-Methyl-2-propylamine; Trimethylaminomethane; Erbumine (INN)

Identifiers
CAS Number	75-64-9
3D model (JSmol)	Interactive image
Abbreviations	t-BuNH_{2} tBuNH_{2}^{t}BuNH_{2} Me_{3}CNH_{2}
Beilstein Reference	605267
ChEBI	CHEBI:44639
ChEMBL	ChEMBL13782
ChemSpider	6145
ECHA InfoCard	100.000.808
EC Number	200-888-1
Gmelin Reference	1867
MeSH	tert-butylamine
PubChem CID	6385
RTECS number	EO3330000
UNII	91Z53KF68U
UN number	3286
CompTox Dashboard (EPA)	DTXSID5024681
- InChI: InChI=1S/C4H11N/c1-4(2,3)5/h5H2,1-3H3 Key: YBRBMKDOPFTVDT-UHFFFAOYSA-N
- SMILES: CC(C)(C)N

Properties
Chemical formula	C_{4}H_{11}N
Molar mass	73.139 g·mol^{−1}
Appearance	Colorless liquid
Odor	fishy, ammoniacal
Density	0.696 g/mL
Melting point	−67.50 °C; −89.50 °F; 205.65 K
Boiling point	43 to 47 °C; 109 to 116 °F; 316 to 320 K
Solubility in water	Miscible
log P	0.802
Vapor pressure	39.29 kPa (at 20 °C)
Refractive index (n_{D})	1.377

Thermochemistry
Heat capacity (C)	191.71 J K^{−1} mol^{−1}
Std molar entropy (S^{⦵}_{298})	233.63 J K^{−1} mol^{−1}
Std enthalpy of formation (Δ_{f}H^{⦵}_{298})	−151.1–−150.1 kJ mol^{−1}
Std enthalpy of combustion (Δ_{c}H^{⦵}_{298})	−2.9959–−2.9951 MJ mol^{−1}

Hazards
- GHS labelling
Pictograms	(GHS02: Flammable) (GHS05: Corrosive) (GHS06: Toxic)
Signal word	Danger
Hazard statements	H225, H302, H314, H331
Precautionary statements	P210, P261, P280, P305+P351+P338, P310
NFPA 704 (fire diamond)	3 4 0
Flash point	−38 °C (−36 °F; 235 K)
Autoignition temperature	380 °C (716 °F; 653 K)
Explosive limits	1.7–9.8%
- Lethal dose or concentration (LD, LC)
LD_{50} (median dose)	464 mg kg^{−1} (oral, rat)
Safety data sheet (SDS)	rose-hulman.edu

Related compounds
Related alkanamines	Ethylamine; Propylamine; Isopropylamine; Isobutylamine; n-Butylamine; sec-Butylamine; Putrescine
Related compounds	2-Methyl-2-nitrosopropane
- Except where otherwise noted, data are given for materials in their standard state (at 25 °C [77 °F], 100 kPa). Infobox references

tert-Butylamine (also erbumine and other names) is an organic chemical compound with the formula (CH_{3})_{3}CNH_{2}. It is a colorless liquid with a typical amine-like odor. tert-Butylamine is one of the four isomeric amines of butane, the others being n-butylamine, sec-butylamine and isobutylamine.

== Preparation ==
tert-Butylamine is produced commercially by direct amination of isobutylene using zeolite catalysts:

$$\ce{NH3 + CH2=C(CH3)2-> H2NC(CH3)3}$$

The Ritter reaction of isobutene with hydrogen cyanide is not useful because it produces too much waste.

$$\ce{(CH3)2C=CH2 + HCN + H2O -> (CH3)3CNHCHO}$$
$$\ce{(CH3)3CNHCHO + H2O -> (CH3)3CNH2 + HCO2H}$$

In the laboratory, it can be prepared by the hydrogenolysis of 2,2-dimethylethylenimine, or via tert-butylphthalimide.

== Uses ==
tert-Butylamine is used as an intermediate in the preparation of the sulfenamides such as N-tert-butyl-2-benzothiazylsulfenamide and N-tert-butyl-2-benzothiazylsulfenimide. As rubber accelerators, these compounds modify the rate of vulcanization of rubber. A variety of pesticides are derived from this amine, including terbacil, terbutryn, and terbumeton.

In pharmacology under the name erbumine, tert-butylamine has been used as a counterion in drug substances such as perindopril erbumine.

== See also ==
- Borane tert-butylamine complex
