= Sec-Butylamine =

sec-Butylamine
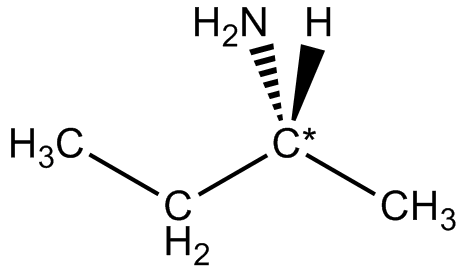
Structural formula of (R)-sec-butylamine
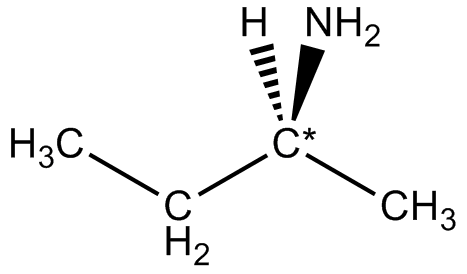
Structural formula of (S)-sec-butylamine
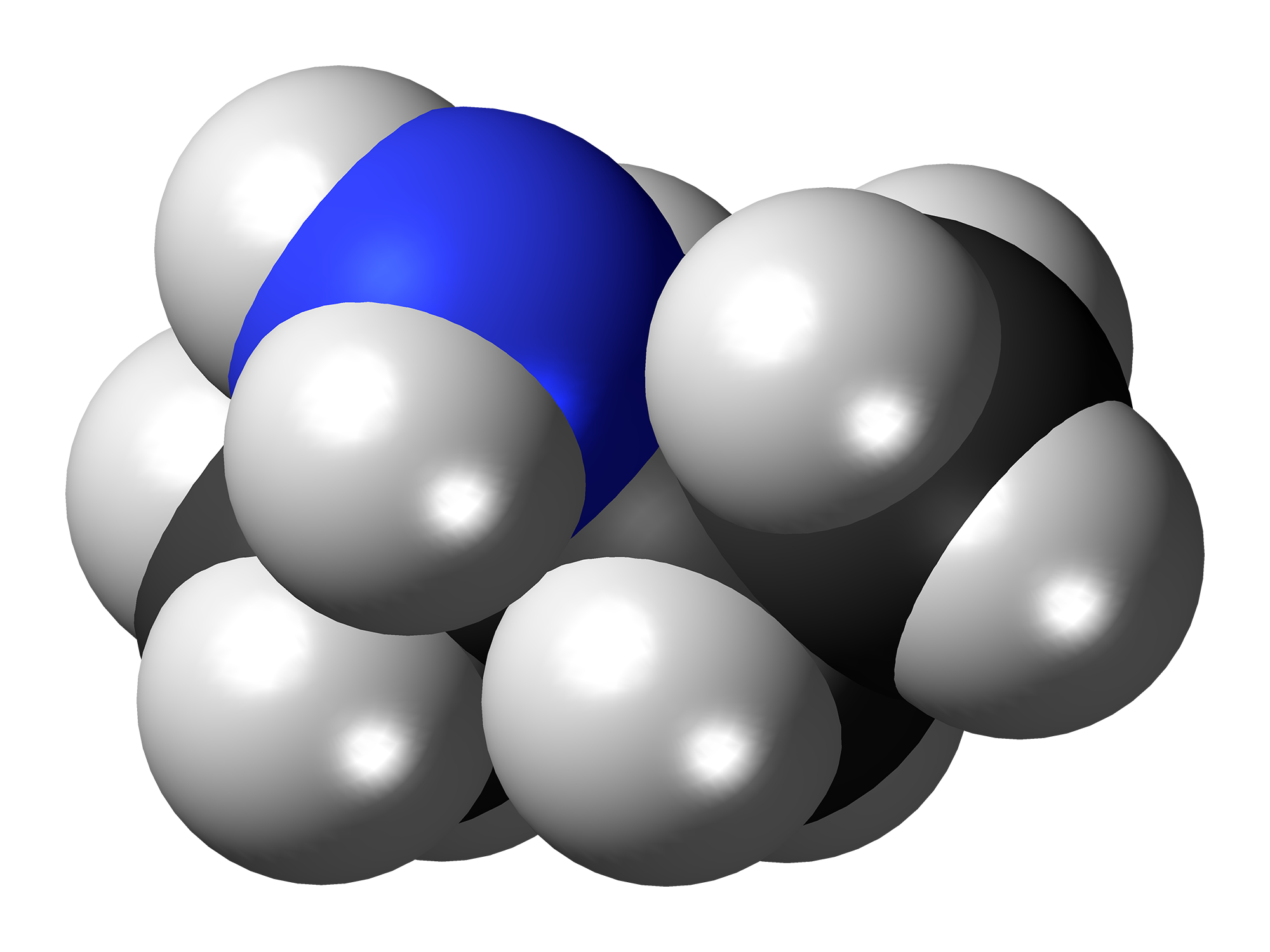
Space-filling model of (R)-sec-Butylamine
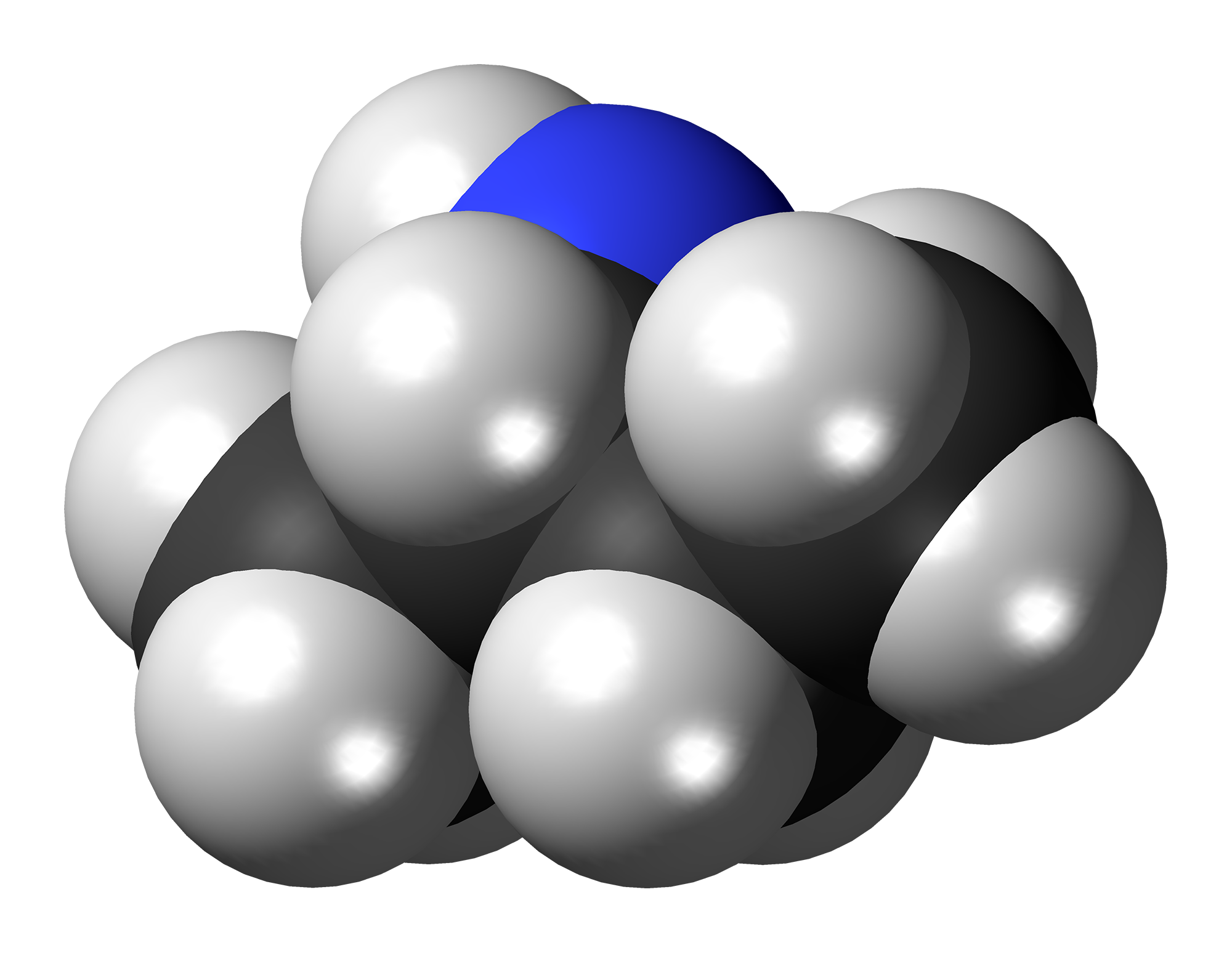
Space-filling model of (S)-sec-Butylamine

Names
- Preferred IUPAC name Butan-2-amine
- Other names: 2-Aminobutane; 2-Butanamine; (±)-sec-Butylamine; DL-sec-Butylamine; 1-Methylpropylamine; Mono-sec-butylamine

Identifiers
CAS Number	13952-84-6; 13250-12-9 (R); 513-49-5 (S)
3D model (JSmol)	Interactive image; (R): Interactive image; (S): Interactive image
Abbreviations	2-AB s-BuNH_{2} sBuNH_{2}^{s}BuNH_{2}
Beilstein Reference	1361345, 1718761 (R), 1718760 (S)
ChEBI	CHEBI:74526
ChemSpider	23255; 2006669 (R); 5145745 (S)
ECHA InfoCard	100.034.288
EC Number	237-732-7
KEGG	C18706
PubChem CID	24874; 2724537 (R); 6713753 (S)
RTECS number	EO3325000
UNII	QAZ452YGSG; 29HC5ICB6K (R); Z192XWH21O (S)
UN number	2733
CompTox Dashboard (EPA)	DTXSID4022284
- InChI: InChI=1S/C4H11N/c1-3-4(2)5/h4H,3,5H2,1-2H3 Key: BHRZNVHARXXAHW-UHFFFAOYSA-N
- SMILES: CCC(C)N; (R): CC[C@@H](C)N; (S): CC[C@H](C)N

Properties
Chemical formula	C_{4}H_{11}N
Molar mass	73.139 g·mol^{−1}
Appearance	Colorless liquid
Odor	Fishy, ammoniacal
Density	0.724 g cm^{−3}
Melting point	−104.50 °C; −156.10 °F; 168.65 K
Boiling point	63 °C; 145 °F; 336 K
Solubility in water	Miscible
Refractive index (n_{D})	1.3928
Viscosity	500 μPa s (at 20 °C)

Thermochemistry
Std enthalpy of formation (Δ_{f}H^{⦵}_{298})	−138.5 to −136.5 kJ mol^{−1}
Std enthalpy of combustion (Δ_{c}H^{⦵}_{298})	−3.0095 to −3.0077 MJ mol^{−1}

Hazards
- GHS labelling
Pictograms	(GHS02: Flammable) (GHS05: Corrosive) (GHS07: Exclamation mark) (GHS09: Environmental hazard)
Signal word	Danger
Hazard statements	H225, H302, H314, H332, H400
Precautionary statements	P210, P273, P280, P305+P351+P338, P310
NFPA 704 (fire diamond)	3 3 0
Flash point	19 °C (66 °F; 292 K)
- Lethal dose or concentration (LD, LC)
LD_{50} (median dose)	152 mg kg^{−1} (oral, rat); 2.5 g kg^{−1} (dermal, rabbit)

Related compounds
Related alkanamines	Propylamine; Isopropylamine; Isobutylamine; tert-Butylamine; n-Butylamine
Related compounds	2-Methyl-2-nitrosopropane
- Except where otherwise noted, data are given for materials in their standard state (at 25 °C [77 °F], 100 kPa). verify (what is ?) Infobox references

sec-Butylamine is an organic chemical compound (specifically, an amine) with the formula CH_{3}CH_{2}CH(NH_{2})CH_{3}. It is a colorless liquid. sec-Butylamine is one of the four isomeric amines of butane, the others being n-butylamine, tert-butylamine, and isobutylamine. sec-Butylamine is chiral, this simplest chiral amine, in fact. The compounds has been resolved into individual enantiomers by formation of the diastereomeric tartrate salts.

sec-Butylamine is used in the production of some pesticides.

Bromacil, a commercial herbicide, is produced from sec-butylamine.

== Safety ==
The LD_{50} (rat) for primary alkylamines is on the order of 100 – 1,000 mg/kg.
