= Ornithine decarboxylase =

Class of enzymes

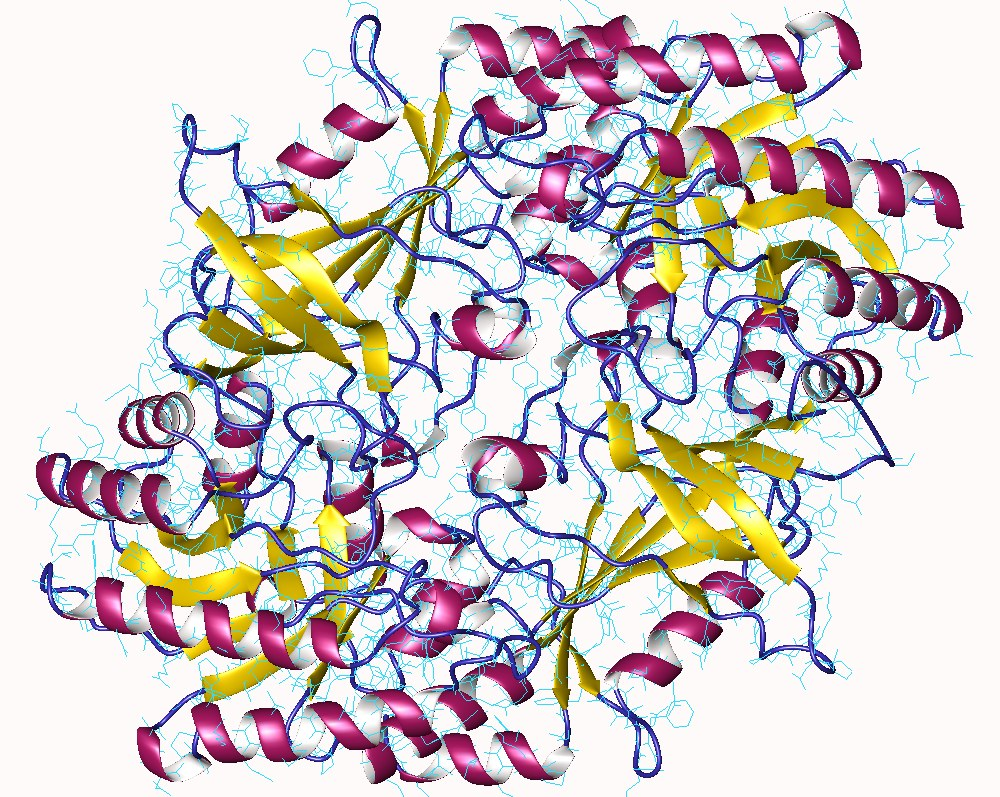
- Ornithine decarboxylase dimer, Human

Identifiers
- EC no.: 4.1.1.17
- CAS no.: 9024-60-6

Databases
- BRENDA: enzyme data
- ExPASy: NiceZyme view
- KEGG: enzyme entry
- MetaCyc: metabolic pathway
- Rhea: reactions
- PDB structures: RCSB PDB PDBe PDBsum
- Gene Ontology: AmiGO / QuickGO
Search
- PMC: articles
- PubMed: articles
- NCBI: proteins

ODC1

Identifiers
- Aliases: ODC1, ODC, ornithine decarboxylase 1, NEDBIA, BABS, NEDBA
- External IDs: OMIM: 165640; MGI: 97402; GeneCards: ODC1
Available structures
PDB	Ortholog search: PDBe RCSB
PDB	List of PDB id codes 2OO0, 4ZGY, 5BWA, 1D7K, 2ON3
Enzyme activity
EC #	BRENDA	ExPASy	KEGG	MetaCyc
4.1.1.17	↗	↗	↗	↗

Gene location (Human)
Chr.	Chromosome 2 (human)
Band	2p25.1	Start	10,439,968 bp
Band	2p25.1	End	10,448,327 bp

Gene location (Mouse)
Chr.	Chromosome 12 (mouse)
Band	12 A1.1- A1.2|12 8.11 cM	Start	17,594,795 bp
Band	12 A1.1- A1.2|12 8.11 cM	End	17,601,506 bp
RNA expression pattern
Bgee	Human / Mouse (ortholog); Top expressed in: secondary oocyte; embryo; ventricular zone; ganglionic eminence; sperm; amniotic fluid; mucosa of sigmoid colon; cartilage tissue; islet of Langerhans; left testis / Top expressed in: spermatid; spermatocyte; right kidney; ventricular zone; morula; tail of embryo; fetal liver hematopoietic progenitor cell; embryo; genital tubercle; embryo; More reference expression data
BioGPS	More reference expression data
Gene ontology
Molecular function	ornithine decarboxylase activity; protein binding; protein homodimerization activity; carboxy-lyase activity; catalytic activity; lyase activity
Cellular component	perinuclear region of cytoplasm; cytosol; cytoplasm; cellular component
Biological process	putrescine biosynthetic process; polyamine biosynthetic process; response to virus; polyamine metabolic process; regulation of cellular amino acid metabolic process; positive regulation of cell population proliferation; kidney development; regulation of protein catabolic process; putrescine biosynthetic process from ornithine
Sources:Amigo / QuickGO
Orthologs
Databases	NCBI: entry; OMA: entry
Species	Human	Mouse
Entrez	4953	18263
Ensembl	ENSG00000115758	ENSMUSG00000011179
UniProt	P11926	P00860
RefSeq (mRNA)	NM_002539; NM_001287188; NM_001287189; NM_001287190	NM_013614
RefSeq (protein)	NP_001274117; NP_001274118; NP_001274119; NP_002530	NP_038642
Location (UCSC)	Chr 2: 10.44 – 10.45 Mb	Chr 12: 17.59 – 17.6 Mb
PubMed search
- Wikidata
View/Edit Human	View/Edit Mouse

The enzyme ornithine decarboxylase (EC 4.1.1.17, ODC) catalyzes the decarboxylation of ornithine (a non-proteinogenic amino acid commonly produced from arginine) to form putrescine. Ornithine is part of both the urea cycle and polyamine synthesis, and this reaction is the committed step in that latter polyamine pathway. In the urea cycle, ornithine is instead acted on by the enzyme ornithine transcarbamylase. In humans, this protein has 461 amino acids and forms a homodimer.

In humans, ornithine decarboxylase (ODC) is expressed by the gene ODC1. The protein ODC is sometimes referred to as "ODC1" in research pertaining to humans and mice, but certain species such as Drosophila (dODC2), species of Solanaceae plant family (ODC2), and the lactic acid bacteria Paucilactobacillus wasatchensis (odc2) have been shown to have a second ODC gene.

== Reaction mechanism ==
Lysine 69 on ornithine decarboxylase (ODC) binds the cofactor pyridoxal phosphate to form a Schiff base. Ornithine displaces the lysine to form a Schiff base attached to orthonine, which decarboxylates to form a quinoid intermediate. This intermediate rearranges to form a Schiff base attached to putrescine, which is attacked by lysine to release putrescine product and reform PLP-bound ODC. This is the first step and the rate-limiting step in humans for the production of polyamines, compounds required for cell division.

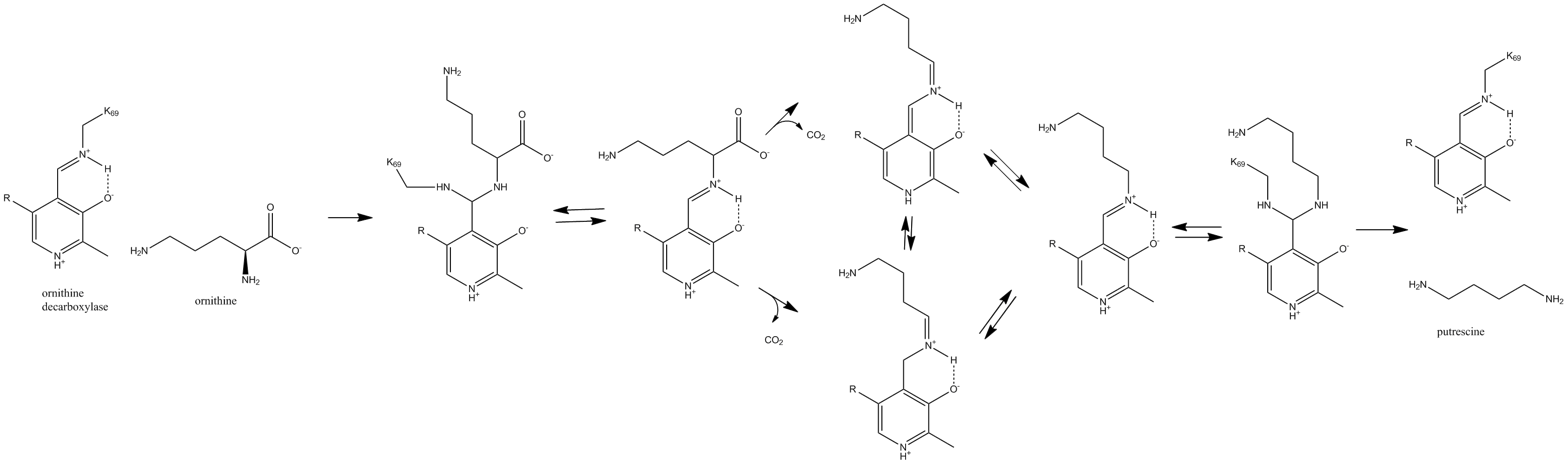

Spermidine synthase can then catalyze the conversion of putrescine to spermidine by the attachment of an aminopropyl moiety. Spermidine is a precursor to other polyamines, such as spermine and its structural isomer thermospermine.

== Structure ==
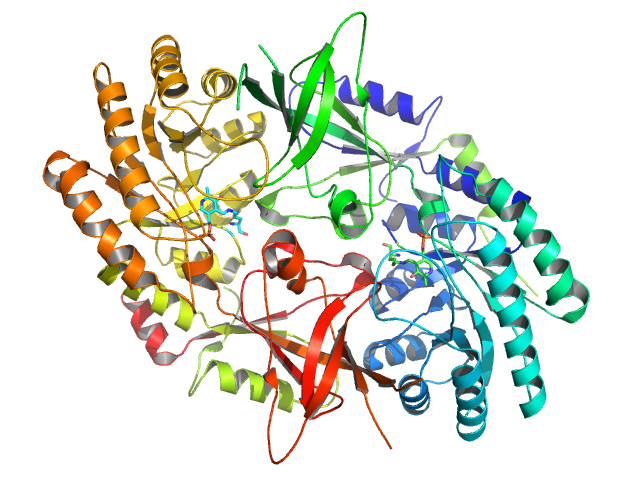
3D crystal structure of ornithine decarboxylase.

The active form of ornithine decarboxylase is a homodimer. Each monomer contains a barrel domain, consisting of an alpha-beta barrel, and a sheet domain, composed of two beta-sheets. The domains are connected by loops. The monomers connect to each other via interactions between the barrel of one monomer and the sheet of the other. Binding between monomers is relatively weak, and ODC interconverts rapidly between monomeric and dimeric forms in the cell.

The pyridoxal phosphate cofactor binds lysine 69 at the C-terminus end of the barrel domain. The active site is at the interface of the two domains, in a cavity formed by loops from both monomers.

== Function ==
The ornithine decarboxylation reaction catalyzed by ornithine decarboxylase is the first and committed step in the synthesis of polyamines, particularly putrescine, spermidine and spermine. Polyamines are important for stabilizing DNA structure, the DNA double strand-break repair pathway and as antioxidants. Therefore, ornithine decarboxylase is an essential enzyme for cell growth, producing the polyamines necessary to stabilize newly synthesized DNA. Lack of ODC causes cell apoptosis in embryonic mice, induced by DNA damage.

== Proteasomal degradation ==
ODC is the most well-characterized cellular protein subject to ubiquitin-independent proteasomal degradation. Although most proteins must first be tagged with multiple ubiquitin molecules before they are bound and degraded by the proteasome, ODC degradation is instead mediated by several recognition sites on the protein and its accessory factor antizyme. The ODC degradation process is regulated in a negative feedback loop by its reaction products.

Until a report by Sheaff et al. (2000), which demonstrated that the cyclin-dependent kinase (Cdk) inhibitor p21Cip1 is also degraded by the proteasome in a ubiquitin-independent manner, ODC was the only clear example of ubiquitin-independent proteasomal degradation.

== Clinical significance ==
ODC is a transcriptional target of the oncogene Myc and is upregulated in a wide variety of cancers. The polyamine products of the pathway initialized by ODC are associated with increased cell growth and reduced apoptosis. Ultraviolet light, asbestos and androgens released by the prostate gland are all known to induce increased ODC activity associated with cancer. Inhibitors of ODC such as eflornithine have been shown to effectively reduce cancers in animal models, and drugs targeting ODC are being tested for potential clinical use. The mechanism by which ODC promotes carcinogenesis is complex and not entirely known. Along with their direct effect on DNA stability, polyamines also upregulate gap junction genes and downregulate tight junction genes. Gap junction genes are involved in communication between carcinogenic cells and tight junction genes act as tumor suppressors.

Mutations of the ODC1 gene have been shown to cause Bachmann-Bupp syndrome (BABS), a rare neurometabolic disorder characterized by global developmental delay, alopecia, macrocephaly, dysmorphic features, and behavioral abnormalities. BABS is typically caused by an autosomal dominant de novo ODC1 variant.

ODC gene expression is induced by a large number of biological stimuli including seizure activity in the brain. Inactivation of ODC by difluoromethylornithine (DMFO, eflornithine) is used to treat cancer and facial hair growth in postmenopausal females.

ODC is also an enzyme indispensable to parasites like Trypanosoma, Giardia, and Plasmodium, a fact exploited by the drug eflornithine.

== Immunological significance ==
In antigen-activated T cells, ODC enzymatic activity increases after activation, which corresponds with increase in polyamine synthesis in T cells after activation. As with ODC and cancer, MYC, also referred to as c-Myc for cellular Myc, is the master regulator of polyamine biosynthesis in T cells.

A 2020 study by Wu et al. using T-cell specific ODC cKO mice showed that T cells can function and proliferate normally in vivo and other polyamine synthesis pathways can compensate for lack of ODC. However, blocking polyamine synthesis via ODC with DMFO and polyamine uptake with AMXT 1501 depleted the polyamine pool and inhibited T-cell proliferation and suppressed T-cell inflammation.

Recent studies have shown the importance of ODC and polyamine synthesis in T helper cell fate commitment. A 2021 study by Puleston et al. showed that T_{H}1 and T_{H}2 cells express higher levels of ODC than regulatory T (T_{reg}) cells and T_{H}17 cells, which corresponded to higher levels of polyamine biosynthesis in T_{H}1 and T_{H}2. A 2021 study by Wagner et al. showed a promotion of a Treg program in Odc1^{-/-} mice. They concluded that polyamine-related enzyme expression was enhanced in pathogenic T_{H}17 and suppressed in Treg cells.
