= Sym-norspermidine synthase =

Class of enzymes

Identifiers
- EC no.: 2.5.1.23

Databases
- IntEnz: IntEnz view
- BRENDA: BRENDA entry
- ExPASy: NiceZyme view
- KEGG: KEGG entry
- MetaCyc: metabolic pathway
- PRIAM: profile
- PDB structures: RCSB PDB PDBe PDBsum
- Gene Ontology: AmiGO / QuickGO
Search
- PMC: articles
- PubMed: articles
- NCBI: proteins

Sym-norspermidine synthase (EC 2.5.1.23) is an enzyme characterised from Euglena gracilis that catalyzes a chemical reaction which transfers a propylamine three-carbon unit from S-adenosylmethioninamine to 1,3-diaminopropane, forming norspermidine, and giving 5′-methylthioadenosine as a byproduct: The enzyme found in Sulfolobus solfataricus can use other amines including putrescine as its substrate.

S-Adenosylmethioninamine
+
1,3-Diaminopropane
Norspermidine
+
5′-Methylthioadenosine

This enzyme is a transferase, specifically those transferring aryl or alkyl groups other than methyl groups. The systematic name of this enzyme class is S-adenosylmethioninamine:propane-1,3-diamine 3-aminopropyltransferase. This enzyme participates in the urea cycle.
