= Streptomyces mutabilis =

Scientific classification
- Domain: Bacteria
- Kingdom: Bacillati
- Phylum: Actinomycetota
- Class: Actinomycetes
- Order: Streptomycetales
- Family: Streptomycetaceae
- Genus: Streptomyces
- Species: S. mutabilis

Binomial name
- Streptomyces mutabilis (Preobrazhenskaya and Ryabova 1957) Pridham et al. 1958 (Approved Lists 1980)

Type strain
- ATCC 19789, ATCC 19919, BCRC 13715, CBS 215.62, CBS 541.68, CCRC 13715, CGMCC 4.1978, DSM 40169, ETH 28442, HAMBI 1069, IFO 12800, IMET 43509, INA B-472, ISP 5169, JCM 4400, KCC S-0400, MTCC 1393, NBRC 12800, NRRL ISP-5169, NRRL-ISP 5169, RIA 1068, UNIQEM 175, VKM Ac-1851

Synonyms
- "Actinomyces mutabilis" Preobrazhenskaya and Ryabova 1957; Streptomyces luteus Luo et al. 2017

Species of bacterium

Streptomyces mutabilis is a bacterium species from the genus of Streptomyces which has been isolated from soil.Streptomyces mutabilis produces the antibiotic mutalomycin. Streptomyces mutabilis UAE1 has been found to promote plant growth in gray mangroves under greenhouse conditions by producing polyamines putrescine (Put), spermidine (Spd), and spermine (Spm).

== See also ==
- List of Streptomyces species
