= Tetramine =

Tetramine is a typical name for a chemical containing four amine groups. Some examples are:

- Triethylenetetramine ("trien"), a.k.a. 1,4,7,10-Tetraazadecane
- 1,4,8,11-Tetraazaundecane
- Hexamethylenetetramine (hexamine)

All of the abive are examples of a polyamine.

- Tetramethylenedisulfotetramine (TETS), a rodenticide banned in most countries

Tetramine is also used as a synonym for the tetramethylammonium cation.
