= Spermine synthase =

Identifiers
- EC no.: 2.5.1.22
- CAS no.: 74812-43-4

Databases
- IntEnz: IntEnz view
- BRENDA: BRENDA entry
- ExPASy: NiceZyme view
- KEGG: KEGG entry
- MetaCyc: metabolic pathway
- PRIAM: profile
- PDB structures: RCSB PDB PDBe PDBsum
Search
- PMC: articles
- PubMed: articles
- NCBI: proteins

Spermine synthase (EC 2.5.1.22, spermidine aminopropyltransferase, spermine synthetase) is an enzyme that converts spermidine into spermine. This enzyme catalyses the following chemical reaction

S-adenosylmethioninamine + spermidine $\rightleftharpoons$ 5′-methylthioadenosine + spermine

Spermine synthase is an enzyme involved in polyamine biosynthesis. In humans, it is coded by SMS (gene), but it is present in all eukaryotes and plays a role in a variety of biological functions in plants. Its structure consists of two identical monomers of 41 kDa with three domains each, creating a homodimer formed via dimerization. The interactions between one of the three domains, the N-terminals of the monomers, is responsible for dimerization as that is where the active site is located; the central terminal consisting of four β- strands structurally forming a lid for the third domain, the C-terminal domain.

== Function ==
The enzyme catalyses a reaction which transfers a three-carbon aminopropyl unit to spermidine. The source is S-adenosylmethioninamine:

S-Adenosylmethioninamine
+
Spermidine
Spermine
+
5′-Methylthioadenosine

The reaction is similar to one which produces spermidine from putrescine by action of spermidine synthase.
