= Adenosylmethionine decarboxylase =

Class of enzymes

adenosylmethionine decarboxylase

Identifiers
- EC no.: 4.1.1.50
- CAS no.: 9036-20-8

Databases
- BRENDA: enzyme data
- ExPASy: NiceZyme view
- KEGG: enzyme entry
- MetaCyc: metabolic pathway
- Rhea: reactions
- PDB structures: RCSB PDB PDBe PDBsum
- Gene Ontology: AmiGO / QuickGO
Search
- PMC: articles
- PubMed: articles
- NCBI: proteins

adenosylmethionine decarboxylase 1

Identifiers
- Symbol: AMD1
- NCBI gene: 262
- HGNC: 457
- OMIM: 180980
- RefSeq: NM_001634
- UniProt: P17707

Other data
- EC number: 4.1.1.50
- Locus: Chr. 6 q21-q22
Search for
- Structures: Swiss-model
- Domains: InterPro

AdoMet decarboxylase
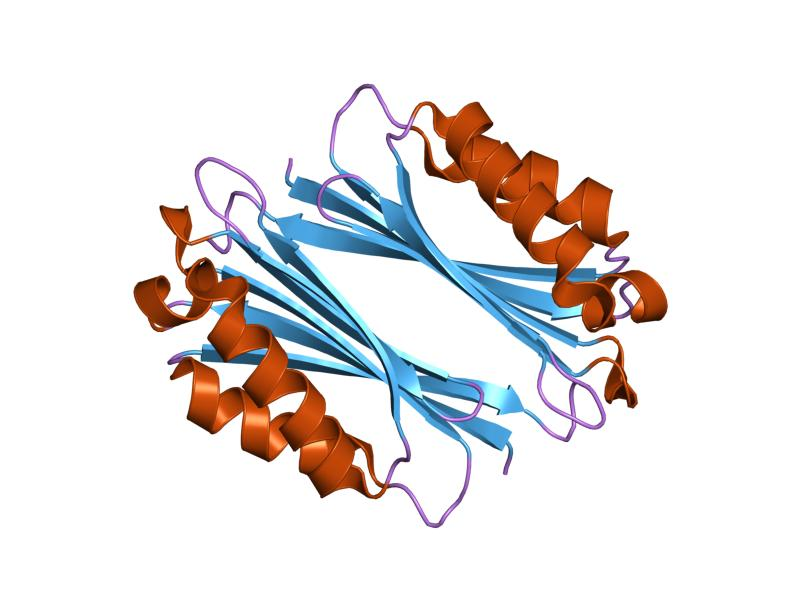
- crystal structure of thermotoga maritima s-adenosylmethionine decarboxylase

Identifiers
- Symbol: AdoMet_dc
- Pfam: PF02675
- InterPro: IPR003826
Available protein structures:
- PDB: IPR003826 PF02675 (ECOD; PDBsum)
- AlphaFold: IPR003826; PF02675

The enzyme adenosylmethionine decarboxylase (EC 4.1.1.50), characterised from Escherichia coli catalyzes the decarboxylation of S-adenosyl methionine to S-adenosylmethioninamine and carbon dioxide:

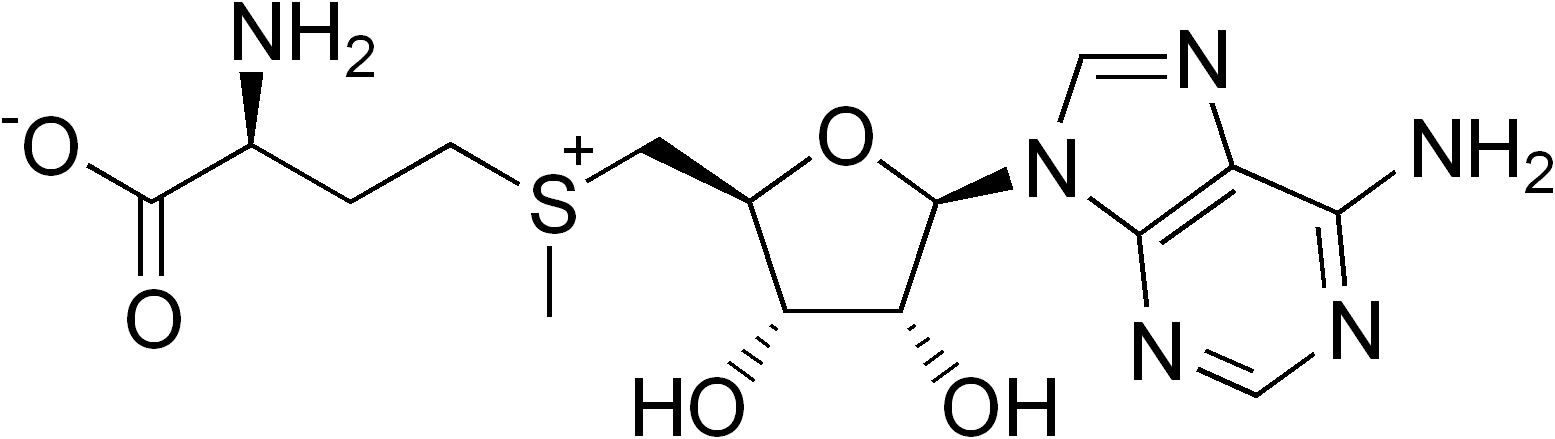
S-adenosyl methionine
H^{+}
CO_{2}
S-adenosylmethioninamine

Polyamines such as spermidine and spermine are essential for cellular growth under most conditions, being implicated in many cellular processes including DNA, RNA and protein synthesis. S-adenosylmethionine decarboxylase (AdoMetDC) plays an essential regulatory role in the polyamine biosynthetic pathway by generating the n-propylamine residue required for the synthesis of spermidine and spermine from putrescein. Unlike many amino acid decarboxylases AdoMetDC uses a covalently bound pyruvate residue as a cofactor rather than the more common pyridoxal 5'-phosphate. These proteins can be divided into two main groups which show little sequence similarity either to each other, or to other pyruvoyl-dependent amino acid decarboxylases: class I enzymes found in bacteria and archaea, and class II enzymes found in eukaryotes. In both groups the active enzyme is generated by the post-translational autocatalytic cleavage of a precursor protein. This cleavage generates the pyruvate precursor from an internal serine residue and results in the formation of two non-identical subunits termed alpha and beta which form the active enzyme.
