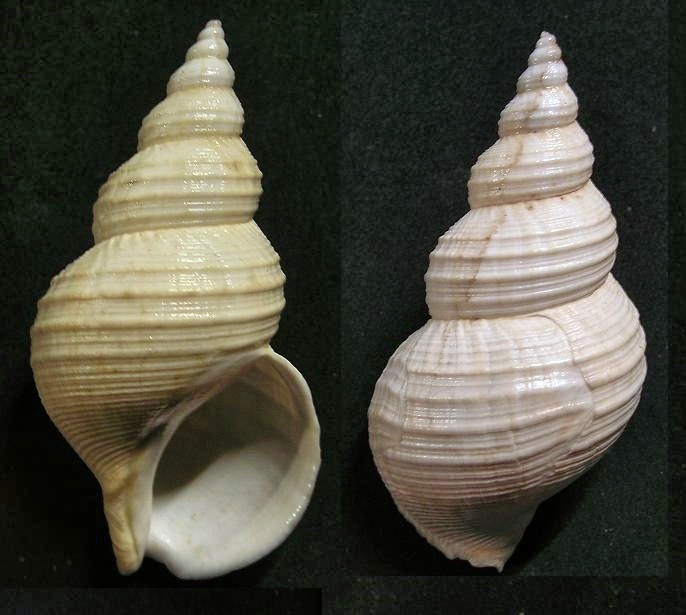
- Two shells of Buccinum leucostoma

Scientific classification
- Kingdom: Animalia
- Phylum: Mollusca
- Class: Gastropoda
- Subclass: Caenogastropoda
- Order: Neogastropoda
- Family: Buccinidae
- Genus: Buccinum
- Species: B. leucostoma

Binomial name
- Buccinum leucostoma Lischke, 1872

= Buccinum leucostoma =

Species of gastropod

Buccinum leucostoma, commonly known as the yellow-mouth buccinum, is a species of sea snail, a marine gastropod mollusk in the family Buccinidae, the true whelks.

== Description ==
The size of the shell of an adult varies between 55 mm and 120 mm. The snail's salivary glands contains the toxin tetramine (tetramethylammonium ion). The male shell tends to be smaller and more slender than the female shell. The interior of the peristome in male specimens is characterised by a reddish orange colour, while in female specimens it is whitish or yellowish.

== Distribution ==
This species is found in the Pacific Ocean off the coasts of Japan.

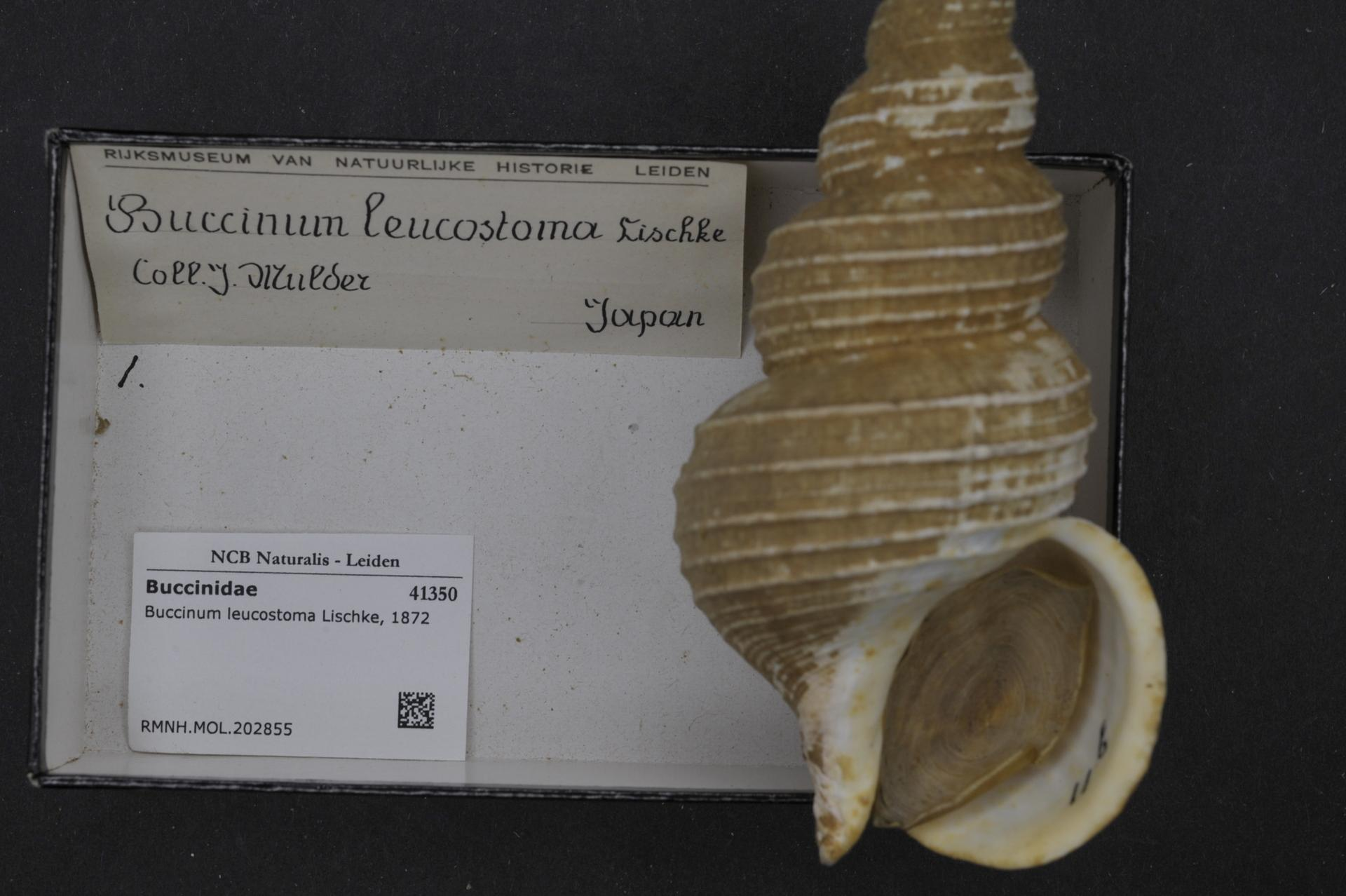
Buccinum leucostoma Lischke, 1872
