= Thermospermine synthase =

Class of enzymes

Identifiers
- EC no.: 2.5.1.79

Databases
- IntEnz: IntEnz view
- BRENDA: BRENDA entry
- ExPASy: NiceZyme view
- KEGG: KEGG entry
- MetaCyc: metabolic pathway
- PRIAM: profile
- PDB structures: RCSB PDB PDBe PDBsum
Search
- PMC: articles
- PubMed: articles
- NCBI: proteins

Thermospermine synthase (EC 2.5.1.79, TSPMS, ACL5 (ACAULIS5), SAC51) is an enzyme characterised from Thalassiosira pseudonana and Arabidopsis thaliana with systematic name S-adenosylmethioninamine:spermidine 3-aminopropyltransferase (thermospermine synthesizing). It catalyses a chemical reaction in which an aminopropyl group is transferred from the coenzyme, S-adenosylmethioninamine to spermidine, giving thermospermine:

spermidine
+ S-adenosyl
methioninamine
thermospermine
+ 5′-methylthio
adenosine

This enzyme is required for correct xylem specification through regulation of the lifetime of the xylem elements.
