= Polyamine oxidase =

A polyamine oxidase (PAO) is an enzymatic flavoprotein that oxidizes a carbon-nitrogen bond in a secondary amino group of a polyamine donor, using molecular oxygen as an acceptor. The generalized PAO reaction converts three substrates (water, oxygen, and a polyamine with both primary and secondary amino groups) into three products (hydrogen peroxide, an amino-aldehyde, and a primary amine). Different PAOs with varying substrate specificities exist in different organisms. Phylogenetic analyses suggest that PAOs likely evolved once in eukaryotes and diversified by divergent evolution and gene duplication events, though some prokaryotes have acquired PAOs through horizontal gene transfer.

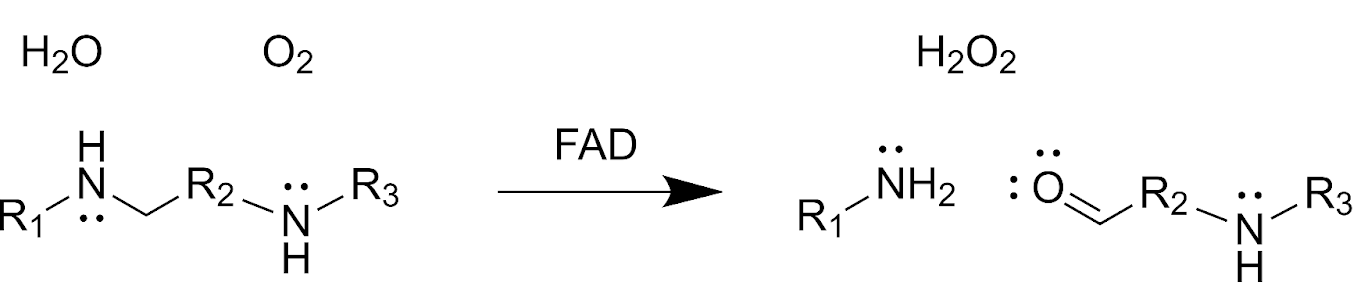
Generalized PAO reaction. R3 is a hydrogen atom, except in acetylated polyamines where it is an acetyl group.

Known PAO Reactions
Substrate	Amino-aldehyde Product	Primary Amine Product	EC Identifier	KEGG Reaction
Spermine	3-aminopropanal	Spermidine	EC 1.5.3.16, EC 1.5.3.17	R09076
Spermidine	3-aminopropanal	Putrescine	EC 1.5.3.17	R09077
Spermidine	4-aminobutanal	1,3-diaminopropane	EC 1.5.3.14	R01914
N1-acetylspermine	N-(3-acetamidopropyl)-4-aminobutanal	1,3-diaminopropane	EC 1.5.3.15	NA
N1-acetylspermine	3-acetamidopropanal	Spermidine	EC 1.5.3.13, EC 1.5.3.17	R03899
N1,N12-diacetylspermine	3-acetamidopropanal	N1-acetylspermidine	EC 1.5.3.13	NA
N1-acetylspermidine	3-acetamidopropanal	Putrescine	EC 1.5.3.13, EC 1.5.3.17	R09074
N8-acetylspermidine	4-acetamidobutanal	1,3-diaminopropane	EC 1.5.3.15	R09075

== Structure and Mechanism ==
Structures of PAOs from corn, brewer's yeast, and mice contain a substrate-binding domain and an FAD-binding domain that secures the FAD cofactor non-covalently. The active site is located at the interface of these domains.

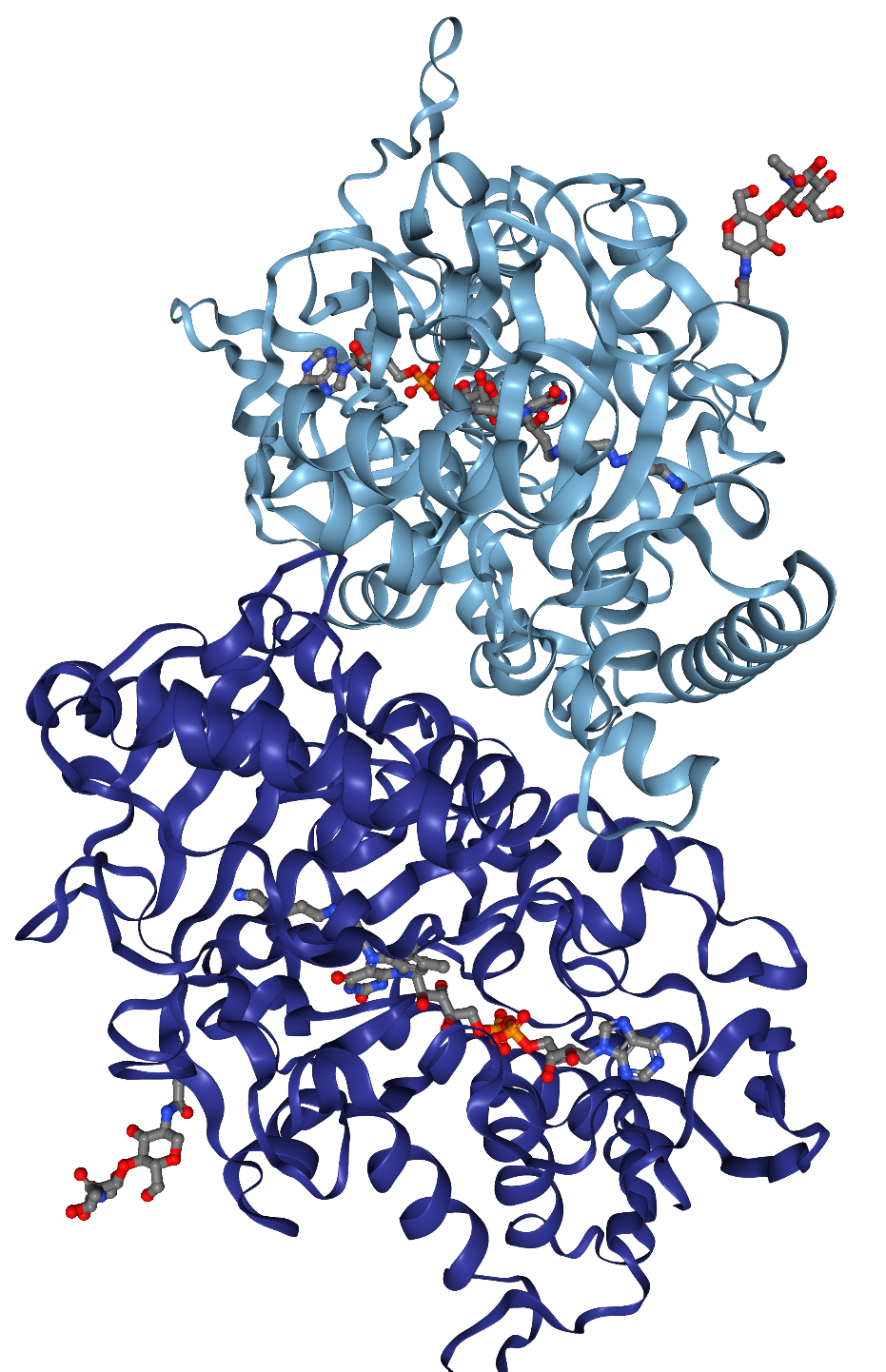
Structure of Zea mays (corn) PAO complexed with an inhibitor and crystallized as a dimer

Active sites in PAOs vary, but some features are essential. The most strictly-conserved active site amino acid codons in PAO genes are a K residue at position 300 and an aromatic residue (F, Y, or H) at position 403 (numbers refer to homologous positions in the sequence of ZmPAO1, a PAO found in corn). K300 hydrogen-bonds to a water molecule, which also hydrogen-bonds to the catalytic N5 nitrogen atom of FAD. In corn, this complex modulates redox potential and reoxidation rate of the cofactor and may be involved in stabilizing the reduced cofactor or imine hydrolysis. The electron-dense aromatic ring at position 403 may interact with amino groups in the substrate. Weak interactions with other more variable active site residues are involved in positioning the substrates.

In the active site, FAD oxidizes the secondary amine to an imine, which water subsequently hydrolyzes, yielding an amino-aldehyde and a primary amine. Molecular oxygen reoxidizes the FAD, generating hydrogen peroxide.

Three possible mechanisms of polyamine oxidation by FAD based on the structure of mouse N1-Acetylspermine Oxidase;'"`UNIQ--ref-00000018-QINU`"' the secondary amine oxidized must be in the charge-neutral, deprotonated state. This oxidation may proceed by hydride transfer (left), radical abstraction (center), or nucleophilic attack with a covalently-bonded cofactor-substrate intermediate (right). All three are equally plausible given the structure and none has been confirmed as the true mechanism.

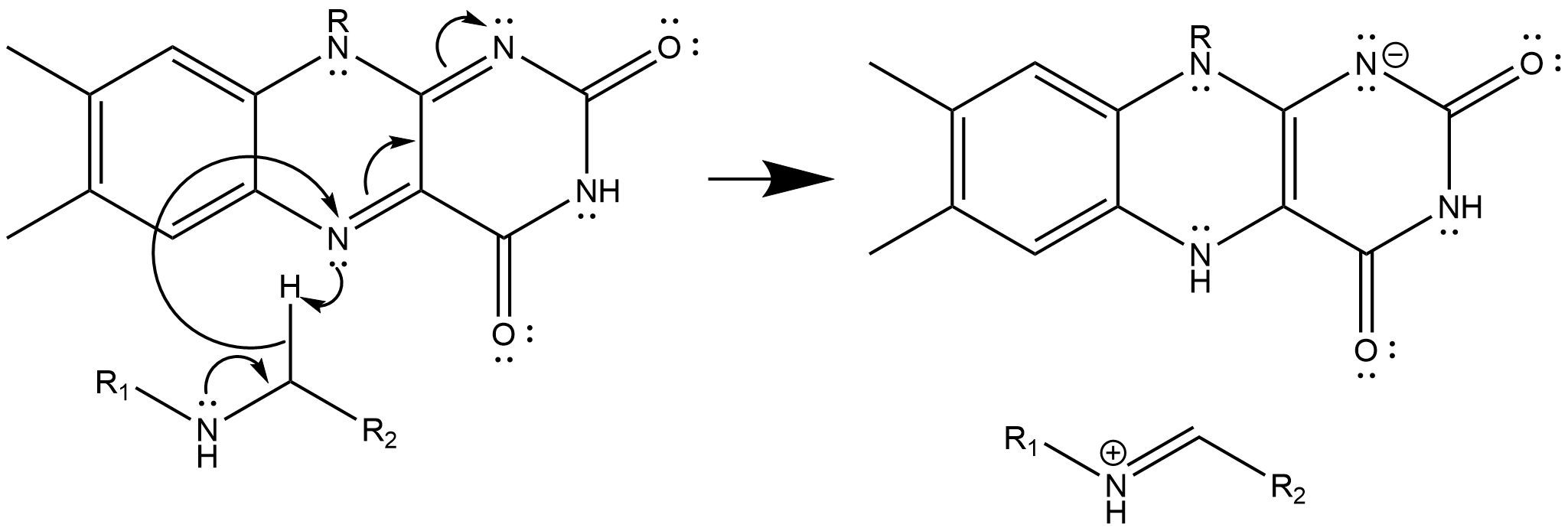
Hydride Transfer Mechanism of Polyamine Oxidation

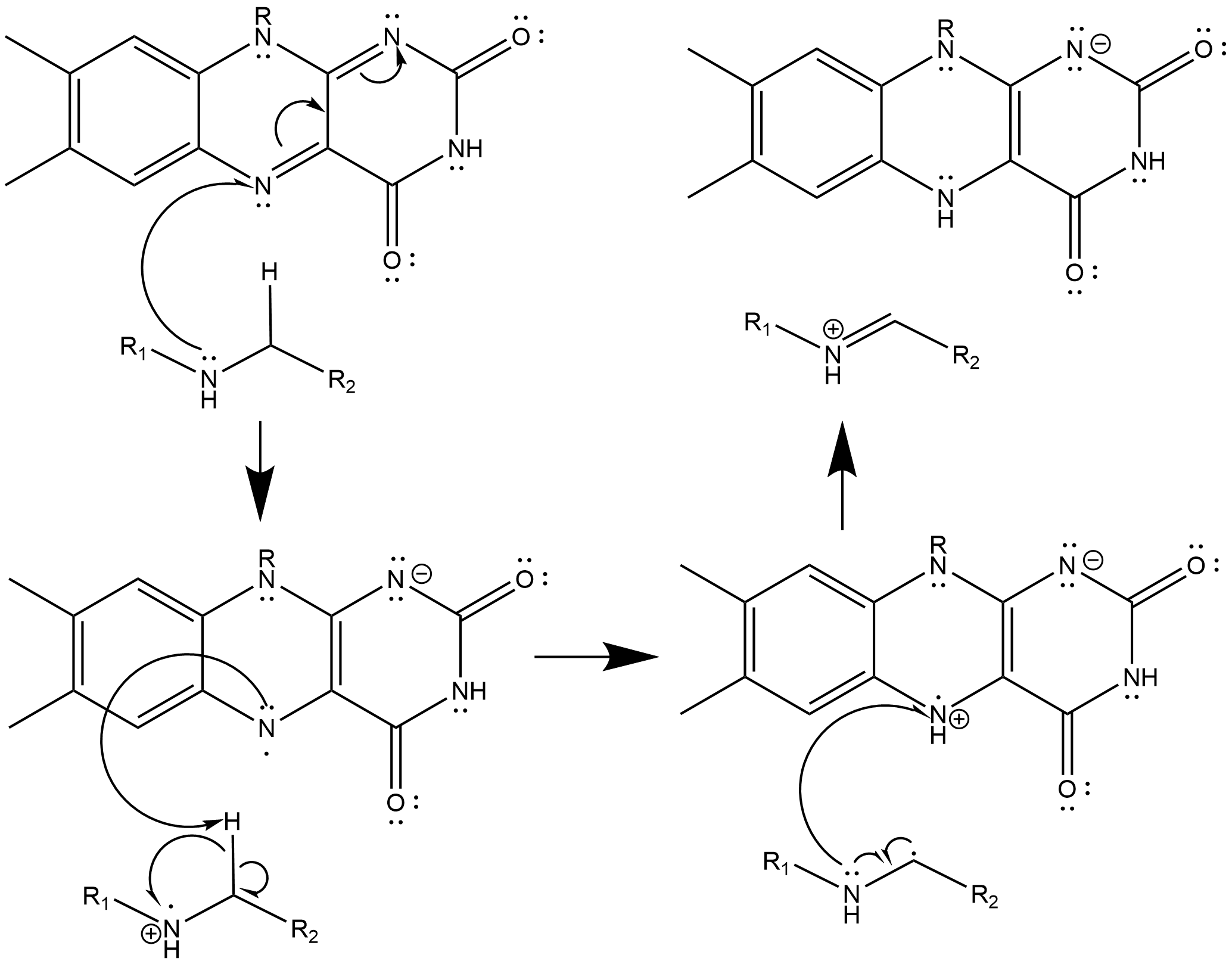
Radical Mechanism of Polyamine Oxidation

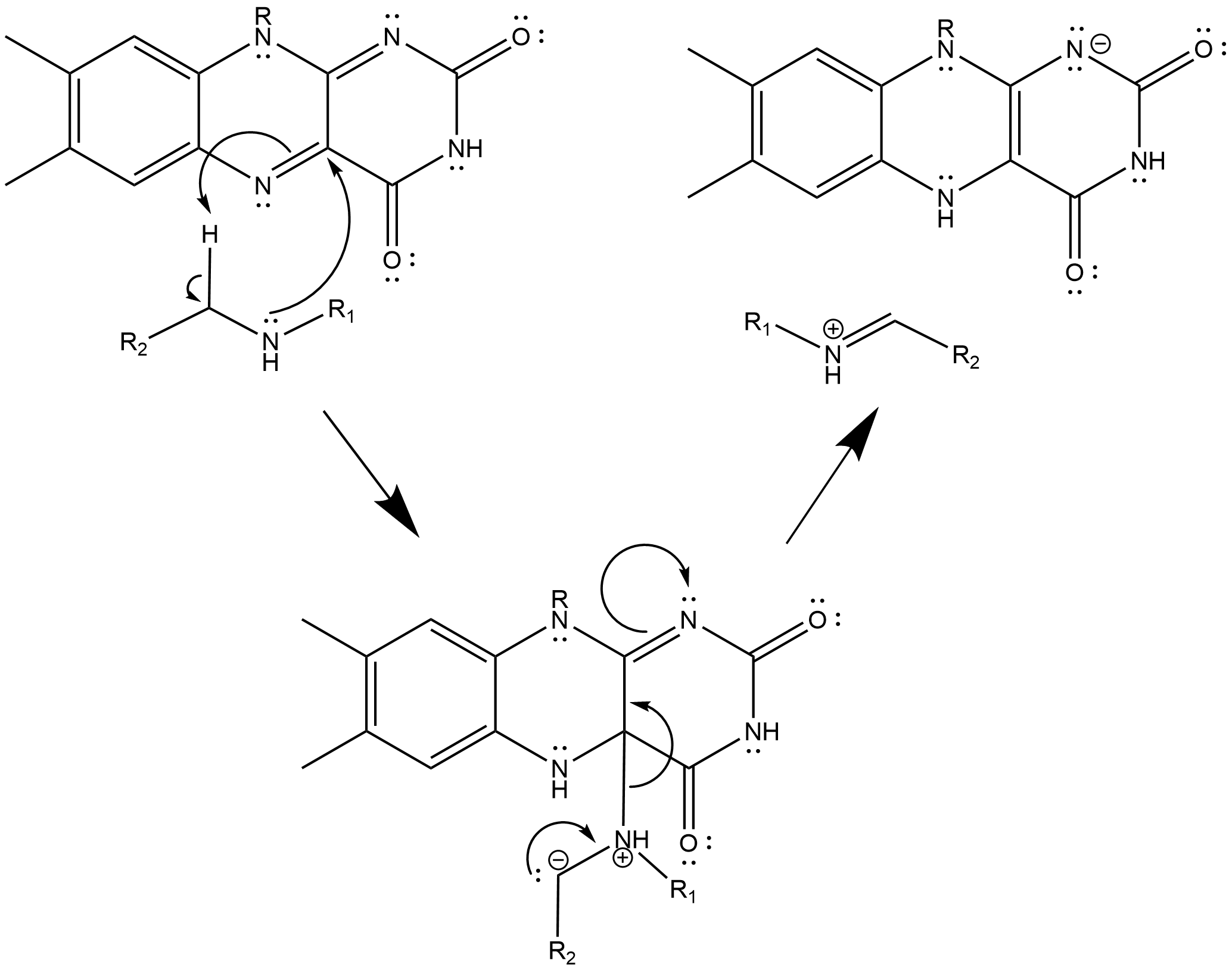
Nucleophilic Mechanism of Polyamine Oxidation

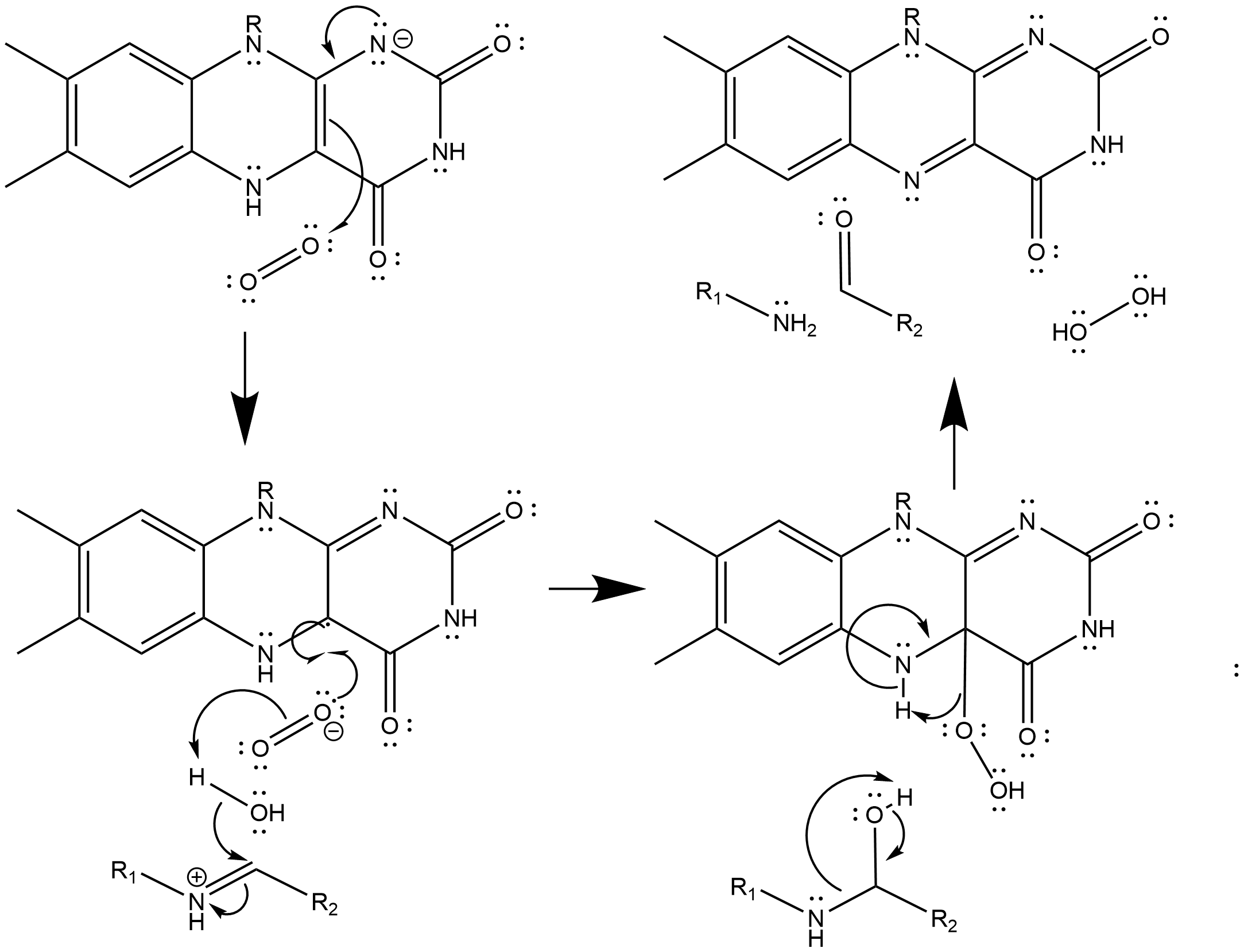
Mechanism of Imine Hydrolysis and Cofactor Reoxidation with a Superoxide Intermediate

== Metabolism ==
PAOs are central to polyamine catabolism. Different organic reaction products result in different metabolites with different fates. Because all PAO reactions release hydrogen peroxide, PAOs are tied to the metabolism of reactive oxygen species, which overlaps with pathways of programmed cell death.

Polyamine catabolism is often upregulated in mammalian tumor cells. Molecules downstream of polyamine oxidation play roles in cell proliferation. Spermidine is a precursor to hypusine, which activates eukaryotic initiation factor 5A isoform 1 (eIF5A) that enables translation of mRNA. Putrescine has effects on mTOR complex 1 and eukaryotic translation initiation factor 4E (eIF4FE). Because of this, multiple anticancer drugs in various stages of clinical trial target PAOs.

In plants, polyamine catabolism is tied closely to stress responses and fruit ripening.
