= Polyamines in plant stress =

Polyamines (PAs) are small, positively charged, organic molecules that are ubiquitous in all living organisms. These are considered as one of the oldest group of substances known in biochemistry. There are three common types of polyamines, putrescine, spermidine, thermospermine according to structure, universal distribution in all cellular compartments, and presumed involvement in physiological activities. Polyamine is found in all cellular compartments and physiological activities due to their simple structures. The function of polyamine is very diverse in that it performs a key macromolecule to cellular membrane. Because of their essential roles in plant, mutation of polyamines can cause critical damage on plants. Furthermore, some polyamines like putrescine have been reported to influence biosynthetic activities in plants. The activity of polyamines can be categorized to some parts due to its signalling and growing activity.

== Plant stress ==
Spermidine

Thermospermine

Polyamines, which are the key compounds in plant physiology, play essential role in cell proliferation, growth and differentiation. Polyamines also play important roles in cell proliferation and developmental processes across different organisms, including roles in fetal development and angiogenesis.

=== Effect of polyamine on phytochelatin synthesis of rice ===
Even though polyamines carry out important roles like soothing and ameliorating in rice physiology, its catabolic products can cause stress damage. Putrescine, a kind of polyamine, decreases phytochelatin synthesis at enzymatic and gene expression levels by increasing cadmium toxicity in rice. Polyamines provide protection against heavy metals such as inhibiting Cadmium uptake or its entry into the cells because exogenous polyamines are mainly allocated to the apoplast. Spermidine and spermine, kinds of polyamine, are found in reducing cadmium toxicity in rice. Nevertheless, putrescine leads to increasing hydrogen peroxide accumulation and inhibits root elongation in rice. In this case, huge amounts of polyamine-cadmium complexes form, so higher density of cadmium and putrescine decreases phytochelatin synthesis as well as its gene expression. Therefore, plants with decreasing phytochelatin activities can struggle with detoxification of metal ions like Zn, Cu, and Ni.

== Polyamine stress signal ==
putrescine

Polyamines are compounds that are involved in a complex signaling system and have a key role in the regulation of stress tolerance. In the past, however, the main role of polyamines was originally assumed to be as direct protective compounds important under stress conditions because of their cationic nature (-) at physiological pH. This feature of polyamine makes it possible to interact with negatively charged macromolecules, stabilizing and protecting compounds under stress condition. These polyamines can bind to diverse types of proteins non-specifically, and this make it possible to the conjugation of polyamines to photosynthetic complexes and proteins is catalyzed by transglutaminase and leads to enhanced photosynthetic activity under stress conditions.

== Mutagenic stress ==
In the case of Arabidopsis, since polyamines perform essential roles for growth in all organisms, and most polyamine biosynthetic genes are present in at least two copies in plants, break-out of single gene mutants can cause critical stress in plant. For example, Arabidopsis showed much lower activity in seed development when a specific gene was impaired. With both genes of pair impaired (acl5/spms), arabidopsis cannot perform enzyme activities anymore because it compromises thermospermine-spermine biosynthesis and causes hypersensitivity to NaCl and KCl. The mutant level of thermospermine-spermine can also disturb homeostasis of calcium ions leading to a differential response to salts.

== Difficulty in research ==
With ubiquitous presence, absolute necessity for cell survival, and their presence in relatively large quantities, it is difficult to explain the accurate roles of polyamines in plant stress. Especially, the mechanism of polyamines in plant stress is not fully identified. problems relating to the role of PAs in abiotic stress is the lack of our understanding of the mechanisms underlying their function. Furthermore, it is hard to generalize the polyamines are directly associated to stress condition because there is often an immediate increase in polyamine levels in response to stress, but after a while polyamine levels decrease and resemble those of non-stressed plants, even if the stress conditions persist.
