= Discadenine synthase =

Class of enzymes

Identifiers
- EC no.: 2.5.1.24
- CAS no.: 74082-52-3

Databases
- IntEnz: IntEnz view
- BRENDA: BRENDA entry
- ExPASy: NiceZyme view
- KEGG: KEGG entry
- MetaCyc: metabolic pathway
- PRIAM: profile
- PDB structures: RCSB PDB PDBe PDBsum
- Gene Ontology: AmiGO / QuickGO
Search
- PMC: articles
- PubMed: articles
- NCBI: proteins

Discadenine synthase (EC 2.5.1.24) is an enzyme characterised from Dictyostelium discoideum that catalyzes a chemical reaction which converts N6-isopentenyladenine to discadenine. It transfers the 3-amino-3-carboxypropyl group from the coenzyme, S-adenosyl methionine, giving 5'-methylthioadenosine as a byproduct.

N6-isopentenyladenine
+
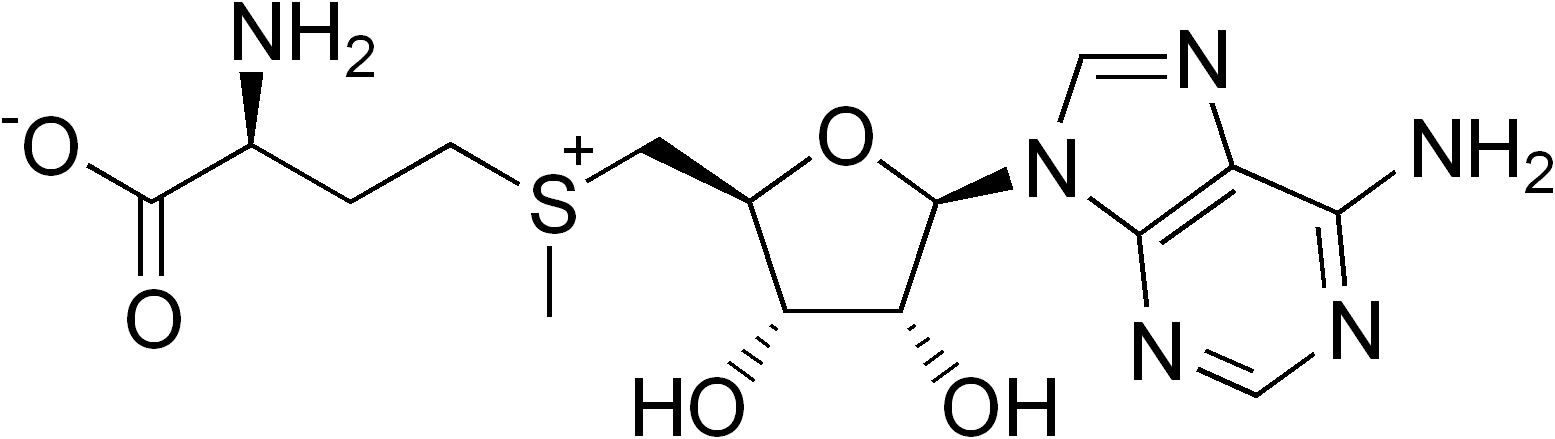
S-Adenosyl methionine
Discadenine
+
5′-Methylthioadenosine

The product discadenine inhibits spore germination in this soil-dwelling amoeba.

This enzyme is a transferase, specifically those transferring aryl or alkyl groups other than methyl groups. The systematic name of this enzyme class is S-adenosyl-L-methionine:N6-(Delta2-isopentenyl)-adenine 3-(3-amino-3-carboxypropyl)-transferase. Other names in common use include discadenine synthetase, S-adenosyl-L-methionine:6-N-(Delta2-isopentenyl)-adenine, and 3-(3-amino-3-carboxypropyl)-transferase.
