= Orphalan =

French biotechnology company

- Company type: Private
- Industry: Biotechnology
- Founded: 2011
- Headquarters: Paris, France
- Key people: Naseem Amin (Chief Executive Officer) Shahzad Malik (Chairman of the Board)
- Products: Trientine tetrahydrochloride/盐酸曲恩汀 (Cuprior/Cuvrior/科佩欧)
- Number of employees: 125
- Website: www.orphalan.com

Orphalan S.A. is an orphan drug development and commercialization company headquartered in Paris, France. It specializes in the development of treatments for patients with Rare diseases.

Its trientine tetrahydrochloride (盐酸曲恩汀) product, (branded as Cuprior in the EU and some key markets, Cuvrior in the USA and 科佩欧 (Ke Pei Ou) in China) is a treatment for Wilson's disease, which is available in over 30 countries.

== History ==
Orphalan S.A. was founded in 2011. In March 2016, trientine tetrahydrochloride (brand name Cuvrior in the USA) was granted orphan drug designation in the USA by the Food and Drug Administration (FDA) for the indication: treatment of Wilson's disease excluding patients intolerant to penicillamine.

In September 2017, the European Medicines Agency (EMA) granted marketing authorization for trientine tetrahydrochloride (brand name Cuprior) for the treatment of Wilson's disease in adults, adolescents and children ≥5 years intolerant to D-penicillamine therapy.

In October 2017, Naseem Amin joined Orphalan as Chief Executive Officer.

In 2019, trientine tetrahydrochloride was launched commercially in the EU

In 2021, the International Wilson Disease (iWD) Registry was established (a centralized database that is sponsored and managed by Orphalan SA). This includes health data from consenting people with Wilson's disease from various countries around the world.

In April 2022, trientine tetrahydrochloride (brand name Cuvrior in the USA) was approved by the FDA and granted Orphan Drug Exclusivity (ODE). as a copper chelator indicated for the treatment of adult patients with stable Wilson's disease who are de-coppered and tolerant to penicillamine, based on results from the CHELATE trial

In September 2022, results from the CHELATE trial were published in The Lancet Gastroenterology & Hepatology.

In November 2022, Shahzad Malik was appointed Chairman of the Orphalan Board.

In April 2023, trientine tetrahydrochloride was launched commercially in the USA.

In December 2023, China's National Medical Products Administration (NMPA) approved trientine tetrahydrochloride (盐酸曲恩汀, brand name 科佩欧) for the treatment of Wilson's disease in adults, adolescents and children ≥5 years intolerant to D-penicillamine therapy.

In March 2025, trientine tetrahydrochloride was launched commercially in China.

== Products ==
Trientine tetrahydrochloride, a copper-chelating agent for the treatment of Wilson's disease.
