= Adenosylmethionine cyclotransferase =

Class of enzymes

Identifiers
- EC no.: 4.4.1.42
- CAS no.: 9030-34-6

Databases
- IntEnz: IntEnz view
- BRENDA: BRENDA entry
- ExPASy: NiceZyme view
- KEGG: KEGG entry
- MetaCyc: metabolic pathway
- PRIAM: profile
- PDB structures: RCSB PDB PDBe PDBsum
- Gene Ontology: AmiGO / QuickGO
Search
- PMC: articles
- PubMed: articles
- NCBI: proteins

Adenosylmethionine cyclotransferase (EC 4.4.1.42) is an enzyme that catalyzes the chemical reaction

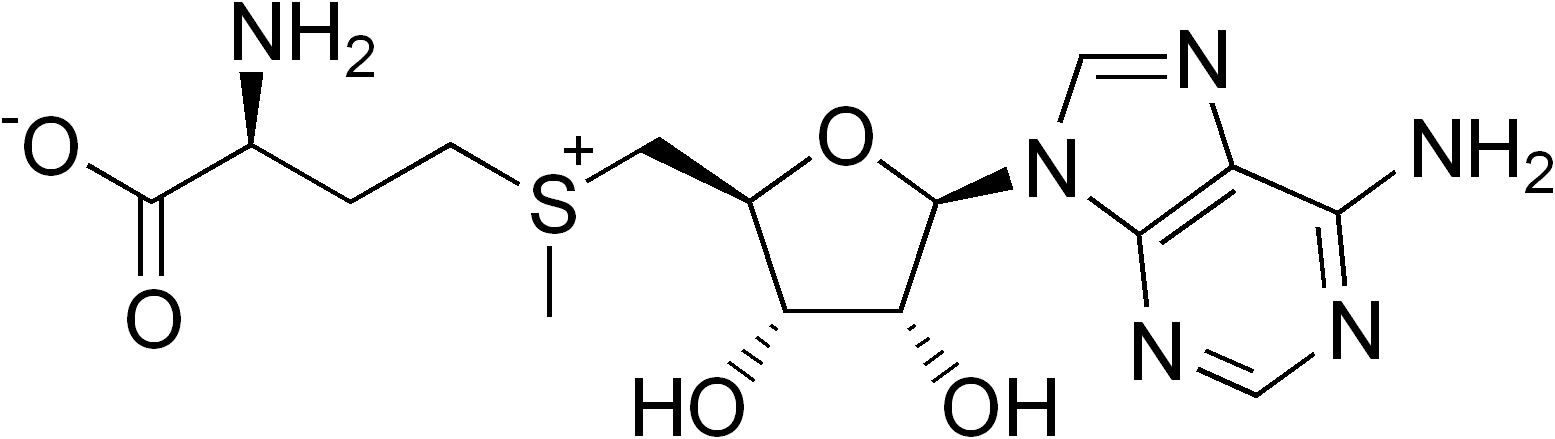
S-Adenosyl methionine
Homoserine
+
5′-Methylthioadenosine

This enzyme has one substrate, S-adenosyl-L-methionine, which cleaves to give initially L-homoserine lactone and 5'-methylthioadenosine. The lactone is converted to homoserine by spontaneous hydrolysis.

This enzyme was originally described from the yeast Saccharomyces cerevisiae and categorised as a transferase. Later, it was found in bacteriophages and called a hydrolase. However, the bacteriophage enzyme is in fact a lyase with systematic name S-adenosyl-L-methionine lyase.
