= Putrescine N-methyltransferase =

Class of enzymes

Identifiers
- EC no.: 2.1.1.53
- CAS no.: 9075-39-2

Databases
- IntEnz: IntEnz view
- BRENDA: BRENDA entry
- ExPASy: NiceZyme view
- KEGG: KEGG entry
- MetaCyc: metabolic pathway
- PRIAM: profile
- PDB structures: RCSB PDB PDBe PDBsum
- Gene Ontology: AmiGO / QuickGO
Search
- PMC: articles
- PubMed: articles
- NCBI: proteins

Putrescine N-methyltransferase (EC 2.1.1.53) is an enzyme that catalyzes the chemical reaction

Putrescine
+ SAM
N-methylputrescine
+ SAH

This is a methylation reaction in which putrescine is converted to N-methylputrescine. The methyl group comes from the cofactor, S-adenosyl methionine (SAM), which becomes S-adenosyl-L-homocysteine (SAH).

This enzyme belongs to the family of transferases, specifically those transferring one-carbon group methyltransferases. The systematic name of this enzyme class is S-adenosyl-L-methionine:putrescine N-methyltransferase. This enzyme is also called putrescine methyltransferase. This enzyme participates in alkaloid biosynthesis ii.

This enzyme is important in the synthesis of many plant alkaloids. It evolved from spermidine synthase.
