= Spermidine synthase =

Class of enzymes

spermidine synthase
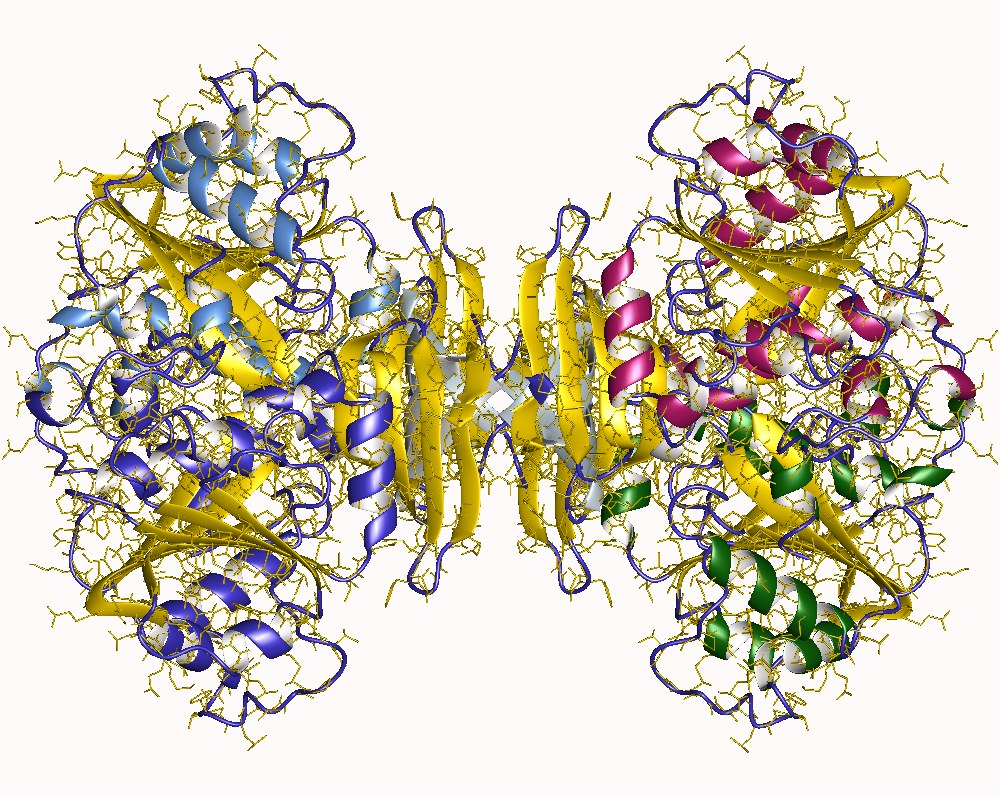
- Spermidine synthase tetramer, Bacillus subtilis

Identifiers
- Symbol: SRM
- Alt. symbols: SRML1
- NCBI gene: 6723
- HGNC: 11296
- OMIM: 182891
- RefSeq: NM_003132
- UniProt: P19623

Other data
- EC number: 2.5.1.16
- Locus: Chr. 1 p36.22
Search for
- Structures: Swiss-model
- Domains: InterPro

Spermidine synthase is an enzyme (EC 2.5.1.16) that catalyzes the transfer of the propylamine group from S-adenosylmethioninamine to putrescine in the biosynthesis of spermidine. The systematic name is S-adenosyl 3-(methylthio)propylamine:putrescine 3-aminopropyltransferase and it belongs to the group of aminopropyl transferases. It does not need any cofactors. Most spermidine synthases exist in solution as dimers.

== Specificity ==
With exception of the spermidine synthases from Thermotoga maritimum and from Escherichia coli, which accept different kinds of polyamines, all enzymes are highly specific for putrescine. No known spermidine synthase can use S-adenosyl methionine. This is prevented by a conserved aspartatyl residue in the active site, which is thought to repel the carboxyl moiety of S-adenosyl methionine. The putrescine-N-methyl transferase whose substrates are putrescine and S-adenosyl methionine, and which is evolutionary related to the spermidine synthases, lacks this aspartyl residue. It is even possible to convert the spermidine synthase by some mutations to a functional putrescine-N-methyltransferase.

== Mechanism ==
It is assumed that the synthesis of spermidine follows the S_{n}2 mechanism. There is some uncertainty if the reaction occurs via a ping-pong or via a ternary-complex mechanism. Some kinetic data, but not all, suggest a ping-pong mechanism, while the investigation of the stereochemical path of the reaction argues for a ternary-complex mechanism. Prior to the nucleophilic attack of the putrescine onto the S-adenosylmethioninamine the putrescine has to be deprotonated rendering the nitrogen nucleophilic since the putrescine is protonated at physiological pH and is therefore inactive.

The reaction catalyed is:

S-Adenosylmethioninamine
+
Putrescine
Spermidine
+
5′-Methylthioadenosine

== Inhibitors ==
The spermidine synthase can be inhibited by a wide variety of analogues of putrescine, S-adenosyl methioninamine and transition state analogues as Adodato (for further information see here)

== See also ==
- Spermine synthase
- Adenosylmethionine decarboxylase
