= Alpha beta barrel =

An alpha/beta barrel is a protein fold formed by units composed of a short α-helix followed by two anti-parallel β-strands, followed by an α-helix and a β-strand; the three β-strands form a β-sheet that runs parallel to the barrel and the α-helix is in the outside of the barrel but does not contact the α-helices of the other repeats like in TIM barrels.

The protein structures known for this fold come proteins from the eukaryotic and archaeal initiation factor 6 family, namely the Methanococcus jannaschii aIF6 and Saccharomyces cerevisiae eIF6, and from the eIF6 from Dictyostelium discoideum.

These alpha/beta barrels are commonly occurring motifs constructed from repetitions of the beta-alpha-beta loop motif. This alpha/beta barrel is a domain of pyruvate kinase enzyme.
