= S-Adenosylmethioninamine =

Names
- IUPAC name S-(3-Aminopropyl)-S-methyl-5′-thioadenosin-5′-ium
- Systematic IUPAC name (3-Aminopropyl){[(2S,3S,4R,5R)-5-(6-amino-9H-purin-9-yl)-3,4-dihydroxyoxolan-2-yl]methyl}methylsulfanium
- Other names S-Adenosyl-(5′)-3-methylthiopropylamine decarboxylated S-adenosyl methionine decarboxy-S-adenosyl methionine (5-Deoxy-5-adenosyl)(3-aminopropyl)methylsulfonium cation

Identifiers
CAS Number	22365-13-5
3D model (JSmol)	Interactive image
Abbreviations	dAdoMet, dc-SAM
ChEBI	CHEBI:15625
ChemSpider	388529
KEGG	C01137
PubChem CID	439415
UNII	Y283L4G9XM
CompTox Dashboard (EPA)	DTXSID701029264
- InChI: InChI=1S/C14H23N6O3S/c1-24(4-2-3-15)5-8-10(21)11(22)14(23-8)20-7-19-9-12(16)17-6-18-13(9)20/h6-8,10-11,14,21-22H,2-5,15H2,1H3,(H2,16,17,18)/q+1/t8-,10-,11-,14-,24?/m1/s1 Key: ZUNBITIXDCPNSD-LSRJEVITSA-N; InChI=1/C14H23N6O3S/c1-24(4-2-3-15)5-8-10(21)11(22)14(23-8)20-7-19-9-12(16)17-6-18-13(9)20/h6-8,10-11,14,21-22H,2-5,15H2,1H3,(H2,16,17,18)/q+1/t8-,10-,11-,14-,24?/m1/s1 Key: ZUNBITIXDCPNSD-LSRJEVITBK
- SMILES: C[S+](CCCN)C[C@@H]1[C@H]([C@H]([C@@H](O1)n2cnc3c2ncnc3N)O)O

Properties
Chemical formula	C_{14}H_{23}N_{6}O_{3}S^{+}
Molar mass	355.43582 g/mol
- Except where otherwise noted, data are given for materials in their standard state (at 25 °C [77 °F], 100 kPa). verify (what is ?) Infobox references

S-Adenosylmethioninamine is a substrate that is required for the biosynthesis of polyamines including spermidine, spermine, and thermospermine. It is produced by decarboxylation of S-adenosyl methionine.

S-Adenosylmethioninamine is derived from S-adenosylmethionine and it is used in the synthesis of spermidine and spermine.

This reaction is catalyzed by S-adenosylmethionine decarboxylase. The enzyme binds to S-adenosylmethionine (SAM) and removes the carboxyl group from the methionine. Once formed, S-adenosylmethioninamine donates its aminopropyl group to synthesize polyamines. Polyamines are important for DNA stability, RNA function, and cell growth.

S-Adenosylmethioninamine is used for regulating metabolic pathways. It is important for the synthesis of metabolites and cofactors, and for the absorption and digestion of proteins. In addition, S-adenosylmethioninamine can be used as a biomarker in metabolic pathways. This is important because it helps in early detection of various cancers and can help minimize metabolic disorders. For instance, recent data shows that in low concentrations of methionine, S-adenosylmethioninamine is unable to produce the polyamines, spermine and spermidine. S-Adenosylmethioninamine can be utilized in cancer research and further testing can be done to better understand its mechanism and its role in the body.

== See also ==
- Adenosylmethionine decarboxylase (AMD1)
- Spermidine synthase
- Spermine synthase
- Thermospermine synthase (ACAULIS5)
