= Bachmann–Bupp syndrome =

Biochemical syndrome

- Other names: ODC1 gain-of-function-related neurodevelopmental disorder; neurodevelopmental disorder with alopecia and brain abnormalities; NEDABA BABS

Bachmann–Bupp syndrome (BABS) is a rare genetic disorder linked to mutations in the ODC1 gene. It is caused by 3' end mutations of the ODC1 gene which produces C-terminally truncated variants of ODC, a pyridoxal 5'-phosphate-dependent enzyme. This prevents ubiquitin-independent proteasomal degradation and leads to cellular accumulation of ODC. This leads to an increased conversion of ornithine to putrescine, causing an accumulation of putrescine. So, if the ODC protein is not properly degraded leading to an accumulation ODC and later putrescine, it causes many gain-of-function mutations. This leads to a wide variety of symptoms which is why misdiagnosis is often a reality. Penetrance of the pathogenic variants for the ODC1 gene is believed to be 100%.

== Symptoms and signs ==
Alopecia, hair is present at birth, sometimes sparse and sometimes an atypical color (darker or lighter than expected). Loss of hair in the first few weeks of life. Absent or sparse eyebrows. Dysmorphic features have been shown but were nonspecific. Developmental delay; motor and speech delays, walking achieved between age 17 months and 4 years. First words between 3 and 6 years. Hypotonia; contributes to motor developmental delay. Behavior; shown to have ADHD, autism, and aggressive tendencies. Growth; larger head circumference for age and sex. Macrosomia was seen at birth but often resolved with age.

== Cause ==
In terms of the etiology we find that mutations in the ODC1 gene. This in turn causes an elevated level of ODC protein.

== Diagnosis ==
Molecular genetic testing is the best technique at truly identifying BABS. The molecular genetic testing can use gene-targeted testing and comprehensive genomic testing depending on the phenotype. The gene-targeting testing will sequence the ODC1 gene to detect small intragenic deletions or insertions of missense, nonsense, and slice site variants. If gene-targeting testing is not used comprehensive genomic testing may be used, this is used when the phenotype is indistinguishable from other inherited disorders characterized by similar symptoms.

== Management ==
With BABS being recently discovered and rare disorder there is no set treatment or cure, at this point. However, different management techniques can be used for the specific symptoms. Surveillance is also recommended such as, measuring growth parameters, nutritional evaluation, developmental progress, and assessment of mobility.

== Epidemiology ==
BABS is an ultra-rare disorder first reported in medical literature in 2018. As of November 2022, less than 30 individuals have been reported.

== History ==
This discovery began when a medical geneticist, had a case of a 3-year-old girl whose symptoms were complete hair loss, an enlarged head, low muscle tone, and developmental delays. Bupp's genetic testing discovered a mutation in the ODC1 gene; however, no one could figure out what the girl had.

== Research ==
An exploratory treatment currently being studied by the FDA is the use of difluoromethylornithine (DFMO). DFMO is an irreversible inhibitor of the ODC enzyme. A case study was created, with receiving approval from the FDA, a young patient began treatment at 4 years and 8 months old. During the first three months the patient received a 500 mg/m2 dose twice a day orally. After the first three months a physical examination showed increased eyebrow and scalp hair growth with improved muscle tone. After the examination the patient's dosage increased to a 750 mg/m2 dose twice a day for another three months. This then increased to a 1000 mg/m2 dose twice a day. Since the beginning of the treatment, the patient has fully grown hair on their scalp, eyebrows, and eyelashes. No side effects have been observed. Also, post treatment of the use of DFMO has shown myelination of white matter in the brain has increased. This has shown that the use of the drug twice a day has improved neurological function.
