= Triethylenetetramine =

- Skeletal formula of triethylenetetramine

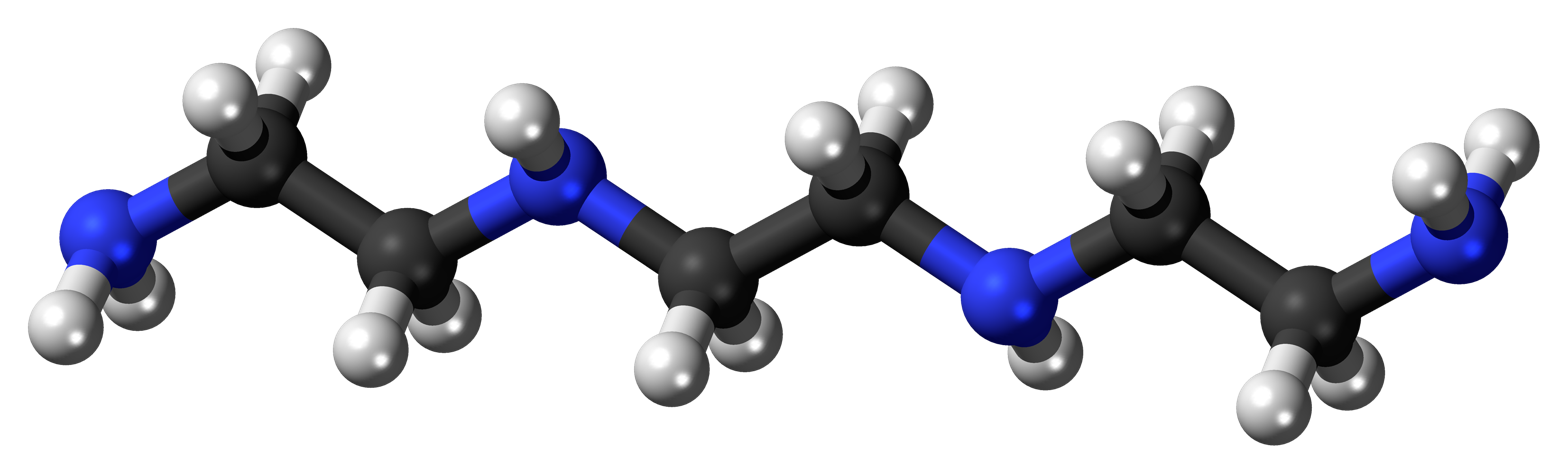
- Ball and stick model of triethylenetetramine

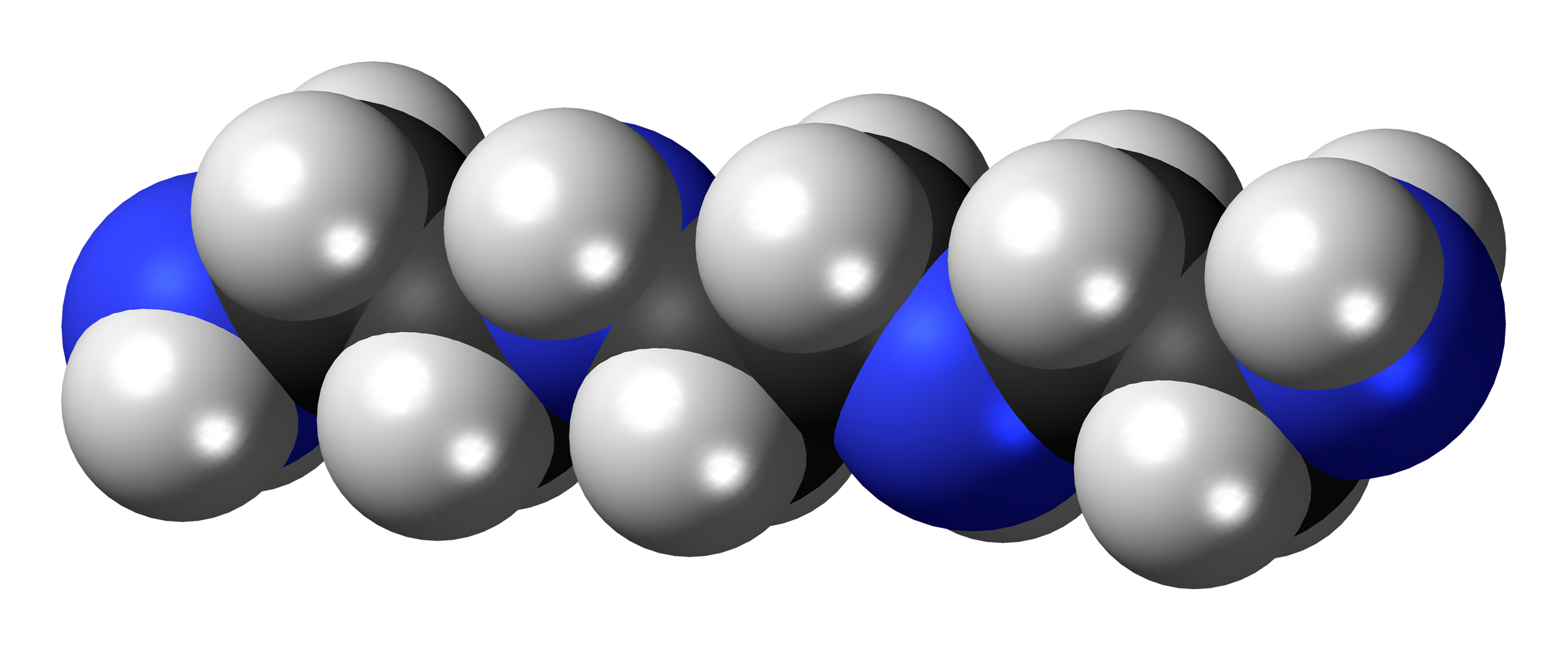
- Spacefill model of triethylenetetramine

Names
- Preferred IUPAC name N^{1},N^{1′}-(Ethane-1,2-diyl)di(ethane-1,2-diamine)
- Other names: N,N'-Bis(2-aminoethyl)ethane-1,2-diamine; TETA; trien; trientine (INN); trientine dihydrochloride; MK-0681

Identifiers
CAS Number	112-24-3; hydrochloride: 38260-01-4
3D model (JSmol)	Interactive image
Beilstein Reference	605448
ChEBI	CHEBI:39501; hydrochloride: CHEBI:9706
ChEMBL	ChEMBL609; hydrochloride: ChEMBL3989777
ChemSpider	21106175; hydrochloride: 64521
DrugBank	DB06824
ECHA InfoCard	100.003.591
EC Number	203-950-6
Gmelin Reference	27008
KEGG	C07166
MeSH	Trientine
PubChem CID	5565; hydrochloride: 71433
RTECS number	YE6650000
UNII	SJ76Y07H5F; hydrochloride: HC3NX54582
UN number	2259
CompTox Dashboard (EPA)	DTXSID9023702
- InChI: InChI=1S/C6H18N4/c7-1-3-9-5-6-10-4-2-8/h9-10H,1-8H2 Key: VILCJCGEZXAXTO-UHFFFAOYSA-N
- SMILES: NCCNCCNCCN

Properties
Chemical formula	C_{6}H_{18}N_{4}
Molar mass	146.238 g·mol^{−1}
Appearance	Colorless liquid
Odor	Fishy, ammoniacal
Density	982 mg mL^{−1}
Melting point	−34.6 °C; −30.4 °F; 238.5 K
Boiling point	266.6 °C; 511.8 °F; 539.7 K
Solubility in water	Miscible
log P	1.985
Vapor pressure	<1 Pa (at 20 °C)
Refractive index (n_{D})	1.496

Thermochemistry
Heat capacity (C)	376 J K^{−1} mol^{−1} (at 60 °C)

Hazards
- GHS labelling
Pictograms	(GHS05: Corrosive) (GHS07: Exclamation mark)
Signal word	Danger
Hazard statements	H312, H314, H317, H412
Precautionary statements	P273, P280, P305+P351+P338, P310
Flash point	129 °C (264 °F; 402 K)
- Lethal dose or concentration (LD, LC)
LD_{50} (median dose)	550 mg kg^{−1} (dermal, rabbit); 2.5 g kg^{−1} (oral, rat)

Pharmacology
Legal status	CA: ℞-only

Related compounds
Related amines	Ethylenediamine; Diethylenetriamine; Cyclam
Related compounds	Ethylenediaminetetraacetic acid
- Except where otherwise noted, data are given for materials in their standard state (at 25 °C [77 °F], 100 kPa). verify (what is ?) Infobox references

Triethylenetetramine (TETA and trien), also known as trientine (INN) when used medically, is an organic compound with the formula [CH_{2}NHCH_{2}CH_{2}NH_{2}]_{2}. The pure free base is a colorless oily liquid, but, like many amines, older samples assume a yellowish color due to impurities resulting from air oxidation. It is soluble in polar solvents. The branched isomer tris(2-aminoethyl)amine and piperazine derivatives may also be present in commercial samples of TETA. The hydrochloride salts are used medically as a treatment for copper toxicity.

== Uses ==
=== Epoxy uses ===
The reactivity and uses of TETA are similar to those for the related polyamines ethylenediamine and diethylenetriamine. It is primarily used as a crosslinker ("hardener") in epoxy curing. TETA, like other aliphatic amines, react quicker and at lower temperatures than aromatic amines due to less negative steric effects since the linear nature of the molecule provides it the ability to rotate and twist.

=== Medical uses ===
Trientine
Clinical data
- Trade names: Syprine, Cuprior, Cufence, others
- AHFS/Drugs.com: Monograph
- License data: US DailyMed: Trientine
- Pregnancy category: AU: D
- Routes of administration: By mouth
- ATC code: A16AX12 (WHO)

Legal status
- Legal status: AU: S4 (Prescription only); CA: ℞-only; UK: POM (Prescription only); US: ℞-only; EU: Rx-only

Identifiers
- IUPAC name: (2-aminoethyl)({2-[(2-aminoethyl)amino]ethyl})amine
- DrugBank: DB06824; DBSALT001269
- PDB ligand: 104 (PDBe, RCSB PDB)
- CompTox Dashboard (EPA): DTXSID9023702
- ECHA InfoCard: 100.003.591

The hydrochloride salt of TETA, referred to as trientine hydrochloride, is a chelating agent that is used to bind and remove copper in the body to treat Wilson's disease, particularly in those who are intolerant to penicillamine. Some recommend trientine as first-line treatment, but experience with penicillamine is more extensive.

Trientine hydrochloride (brand name Syprine) was approved for medical use in the United States in November 1985.

Trientine tetrahydrochloride (brand name Cuprior) was approved for medical use in the European Union in September 2017. It is indicated for the treatment of Wilson's disease in adults, adolescents and children five years of age or older who are intolerant to d-penicillamine therapy.

Trientine dihydrochloride (brand name Cufence) was approved for medical use in the European Union in July 2019. It is indicated for the treatment of Wilson's disease in adults, adolescents and children five years of age or older who are intolerant to d-penicillamine therapy.

The most common side effects include nausea, especially when starting treatment, skin rash, duodenitis (inflammation of the duodenum, the part of the gut leading out of the stomach), and severe colitis (inflammation in the large bowel causing pain and diarrhea).

== Society and culture ==
=== Controversies ===
In the United States, Valeant Pharmaceuticals International raised the price of its Syprine brand of TETA from $625 to $21,267 for 100 pills over five years. The New York Times said that this "egregious" price increase caused public outrage. Teva Pharmaceuticals developed a generic, which patients and doctors expected to be cheaper, but when it was introduced in February 2018, Teva's price was $18,375 for 100 pills. Aaron Kesselheim, who studies drug pricing at Harvard Medical School, said that drug companies price the product at what they think the market will bear.

== Production ==
TETA is prepared by heating ethylenediamine or ethanolamine/ammonia mixtures over an oxide catalyst. This process gives a variety of amines, especially ethylene amines which are separated by distillation and sublimation. An idealized equation follows:

3 H_{2}NCH_{2}CH_{2}NH_{2} → H_{2}NCH_{2}CH_{2}NHCH_{2}CH_{2}NHCH_{2}CH_{2}NH_{2} + 2 NH_{3}

== Coordination chemistry ==
TETA is a tetradentate ligand in coordination chemistry, where it is referred to as trien. Octahedral complexes of the type M(trien)L_{2} can adopt several diastereomeric structures. 1,4,8,11-Tetraazaundecane is a closely related tetraamine ligand.
