= 1,4,8,11-Tetraazaundecane =

Names
- Preferred IUPAC name N^{1},N^{3}-Bis(2-aminoethyl)propane-1,3-diamine
- Other names 2,3,2-Tet; N,N′-bis(2-aminoethyl)-1,3-propanediamine; 4,8-Diazaundecane-1,11-diamine

Identifiers
CAS Number	4741-99-5
3D model (JSmol)	Interactive image
Beilstein Reference	1742732
ChEBI	CHEBI:30348
ChEMBL	ChEMBL1214193
ChemSpider	70844
ECHA InfoCard	100.022.958
EC Number	225-254-1
Gmelin Reference	27228
PubChem CID	78479
UNII	3J941O9333
CompTox Dashboard (EPA)	DTXSID8063591
- InChI: InChI=1S/C7H20N4/c8-2-6-10-4-1-5-11-7-3-9/h10-11H,1-9H2 Key: UWMHHZFHBCYGCV-UHFFFAOYSA-N
- SMILES: C(CNCCN)CNCCN

Properties
Chemical formula	C_{7}H_{20}N_{4}
Molar mass	160.265 g·mol^{−1}
Appearance	colorless oil
Density	0.9501
Boiling point	80–82 °C (176–180 °F; 353–355 K) 20 Torr

Hazards
- GHS labelling
Pictograms	(GHS05: Corrosive)
Signal word	Danger
Hazard statements	H314
Precautionary statements	P260, P264, P280, P301+P330+P331, P302+P361+P354, P304+P340, P305+P354+P338, P316, P321, P363, P405, P501
- Except where otherwise noted, data are given for materials in their standard state (at 25 °C [77 °F], 100 kPa). Infobox references

1,4,8,11-Tetraazaundecane, IUPAC name: N,N'-bis(2-aminoethyl)propane-1,3-diamine, is the organic compound with the formula (H_{2}NCH_{2}CH_{2}NHCH_{2})_{2}CH_{2}. It is a tetramine, consisting of two primary amines and two secondary amines positioned symmetrically. Like many amines, this compound has a high affinity for carbon dioxide. The compound can be prepared by treatment of 1,3-dibromopropane with excess ethylenediamine.

The compound has been examined often as a ligand in coordination chemistry. It is tetradentate ligand similar to 1,4,7,10-tetraazadecane. By condensation of its nickel(II) complexes with formaldehyde, one can obtain a variety of macrocyclic ligands.

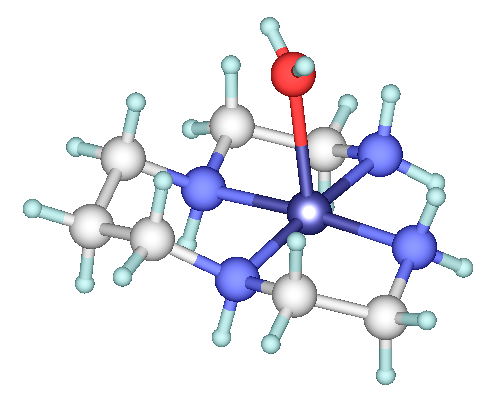
Structure of [Cu(1,4,8,11-tetraazaundecane)(H_{2}O)]^{2+}. Color code: red = O, blue = N, white = C.
