= Polyamine =

Type of organic compound

Polyamines are a type of organic compound having two or more amino groups. The term is not defined consistently, but is typically used to refer to the naturally occurring putrescine, spermidine, and spermine, together with other related compounds. While some alkyl polyamines occur naturally, others are synthetic. Alkylpolyamines are colorless, hygroscopic, and water soluble. Near neutral pH, they exist as the ammonium derivatives. Most aromatic polyamines are crystalline solids at room temperature.

== Natural polyamines ==
Low-molecular-weight linear polyamines are found in all forms of life. The principal examples are the triamine spermidine and the tetraamine spermine. They are structurally and biosynthetically related to the diamines putrescine and cadaverine. Polyamine metabolism is regulated by the activity of the enzyme ornithine decarboxylase (ODC). Polyamines are found in high concentrations in the mammalian brain.

Natural polyamines

spermidine

spermine

=== Biological function ===
Although it is known that the biosynthesis of polyamines is highly regulated, the biological function of polyamines is only partly understood. In their cationic ammonium form, they bind to DNA, and, in structure, they represent compounds with cations that are found at regularly spaced intervals (in contrast to Mg^{2+} or Ca^{2+}, which are point charges). They have also been found to act as promoters of programmed ribosomal frameshifting during translation.

Inhibition of polyamine biosynthesis retards or stops cell growth. The provision of exogenous polyamines restores the growth of these cells. Most eukaryotic cells express a polyamine-transporting ATPase on their cell membrane that facilitates the internalization of exogenous polyamines. This system is highly active in rapidly proliferating cells and is the target of some chemotherapeutics currently under development.

Polyamines are also modulators of a variety of ion channels, including NMDA receptors and AMPA receptors. They block inward-rectifier potassium channels so that the currents of the channels are inwardly rectified, thereby the cellular energy, i.e. K^{+} ion gradient across the cell membrane, is conserved. In addition, polyamine participate in initiating the expression of SOS response of Colicin E7 operon and down-regulate proteins that are essential for colicin E7 uptake, thus conferring a survival advantage on colicin-producing E. coli under stress conditions.

Polyamines can enhance the permeability of the blood–brain barrier.

They are involved in modulating senescence of organs in plants and are therefore considered as a plant hormone. In addition, they are directly involved in regulation of programmed cell death.

=== Homology-directed DNA repair ===
Polyamines promote homologous recombination (HR)-mediated double-strand break (DSB) repair. Polyamines enhance the DNA strand exchange activity of RAD51 recombinase. Depletion of polyamines sensitizes cells to genotoxic substances such as ionizing radiation and ultraviolet radiation. The effect of polyamines on RAD51 arises from their ability to enhance the capture of homologous duplex DNA and promote RAD-51-mediated homologous DNA pairing and exchange activity. Polyamines appear to have an evolutionarily conserved role in regulating recombinase activity.

=== Biosynthesis of spermidine, spermine, thermospermine ===
Biosynthesis of spermidine and spermine from putrescine. Ado = 5'-adenosyl

Spermidine is synthesized from putrescine, using an aminopropyl group from decarboxylated S-adenosyl-L-methionine (SAM), S-Adenosylmethioninamine. The reaction is catalyzed by spermidine synthase.

Spermine is synthesized from the reaction of spermidine with SAM in the presence of the enzyme spermine synthase.

The polyamines undergo rapid interconversion in the polyamine cycle, in which putrescine leads to synthesis of spermidine and spermine, with degradation of these polyamines to form putrescine, which can begin the cycle again.

Thermospermine (NH_{2}−(CH_{2})_{3}−NH−(CH_{2})_{3}−NH−(CH_{2})_{4}−NH_{2}) is a structural isomer of spermine and a plant growth regulator. It is produced from spermidine by the action of thermospermine synthase, which is encoded by a gene named ACAULIS5 (ACL5).

=== Polyamine analogues ===
The critical role of polyamines in cell growth has led to the development of a number of agents that interfere with polyamine metabolism. These agents are used in cancer therapy. Polyamine analogues upregulate p53 in a cell leading to restriction of proliferation and apoptosis. It also decreases the expression of estrogen receptor alpha in ER-positive breast cancer.

== Synthetic polyamines ==
Ethyleneamines are a commercially-important class of synthetic polyamines with ethylene (−CH_{2}CH_{2}− linkages); global production capacity was estimated at 385,000 tonnes in 2001. They are chemical intermediates often used to make surfactants and as crosslinkers ("hardeners") for epoxy resins. Some members of this class include:

- Ethylenediamine, first member of this series. It is a chelating ligand by itself, and it is a precursor to the popular metal sequestrant, EDTA (ethylenediaminetetraacetic acid). Permethylated, ethylenediamine yields tetramethylethylenediamine (TMEDA) that has a very high affinity for lithium ions.
- Tris(2-aminoethyl)amine (N(CH_{2}CH_{2}NH_{2})_{3}) is a branched polyamine that is a minor side product of the polyethyleneamine process. A related tripodal polyamine is 1,1,1-tris(aminomethyl)ethane. These are chelating ligands.
- Polyethylenimine is a polymer derived from aziridine.

Other synthetic polyamines include 1,3,5-triazinane (not to be confused with 1,3,5-triazine) and N-substituted analogs. The methylene (−CH_{2}) linkages are derived from formaldehyde. The reaction product of monoethanolamine and formaldehyde is known industrially as "MEA triazine" (it is actually a triazinane), and it serves as a water-soluble hydrogen sulfide scavenger. Hexamethylenetetramine (hexamine) is another product of formaldehyde and ammonia that has various uses in industry. Domestically, it is used as a solid camping fuel. In the laboratory, it reacts with alkyl halides to selectively prepare primary amines in the Delépine reaction.

Synthetic polyamines

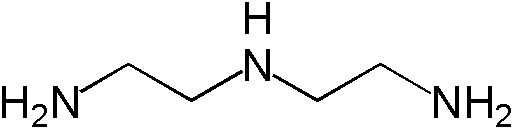
Diethylenetriamine

triethylenetetramine

Tris(2-aminoethyl)amine

1,1,1-Tris(aminomethyl)ethane

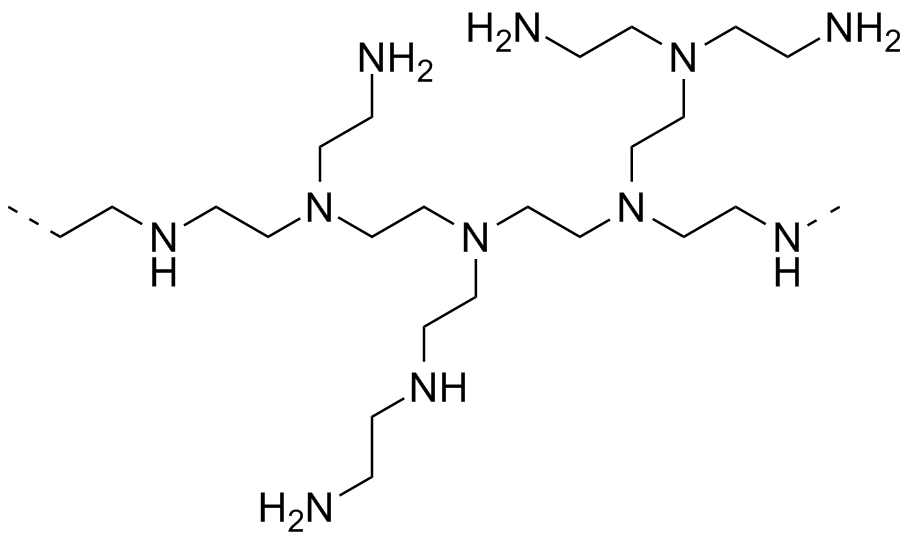
Subunit of polyethylenimine

Hexamethylenetetramine with its adamantane-type structure

1,4,8,11-Tetraazaundecane

=== Polyazamacrocycles ===
Synthetic polyazamacrocycles

1,4,7-Triazacyclononane

Cyclen

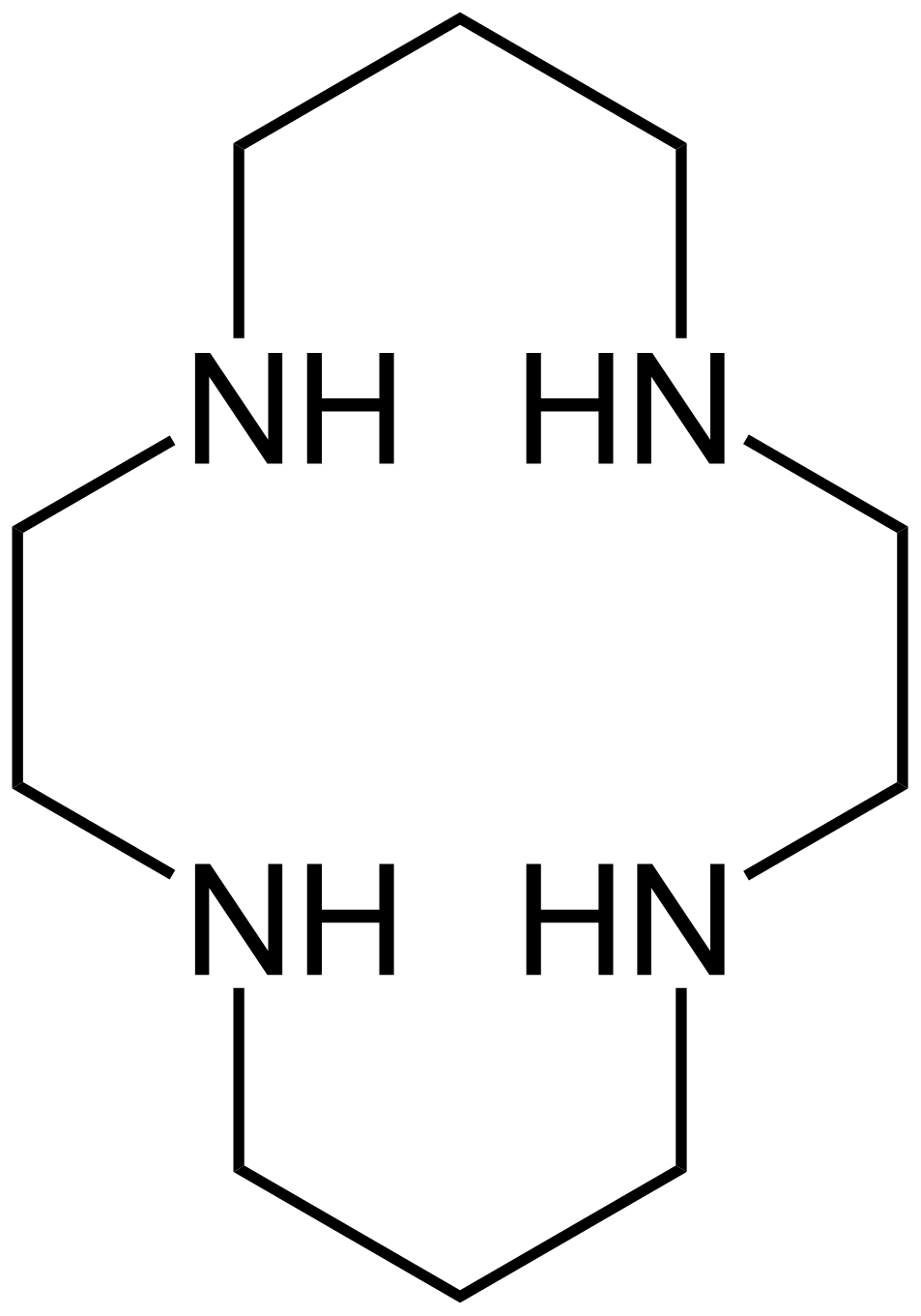
cyclam

Macrocyclic polyamines are analogous to crown ethers. They are employed as ligands in coordination chemistry. Examples include porphyrins, cyclen ((CH_{2}CH_{2}NH)_{4}), and the related cyclam. Triazamacrocycles include triazacyclononane. Pentaaza and hexaaza rings are also known, e.g., hexaaza-18-crown-6.

== See also ==
- Polyamine oxidase
- Polyamines in plant stress
- Polyamine-modulated factor 1
- Aminopolycarboxylic acids
