= Spermine =

Polyamine involved in cellular metabolism

- Skeletal formula of spermine

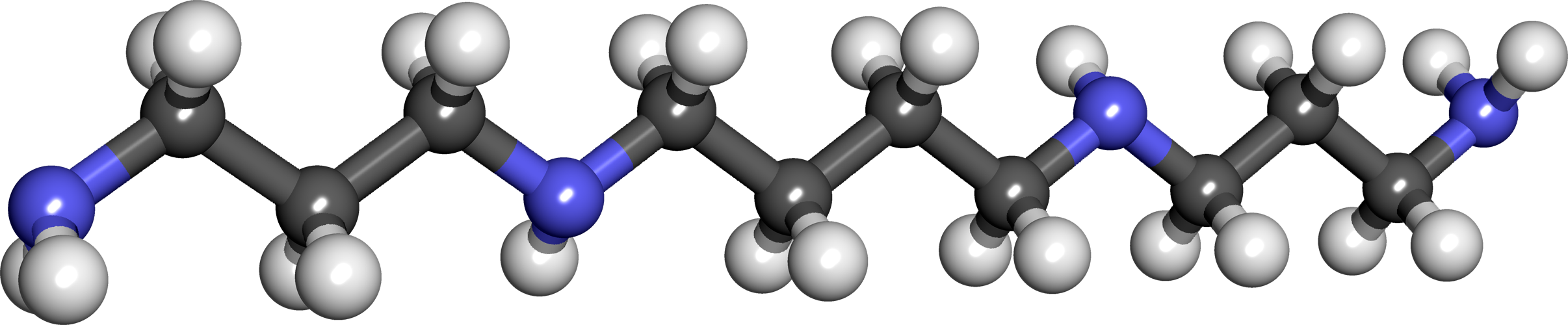
- Ball and stick model of spermine

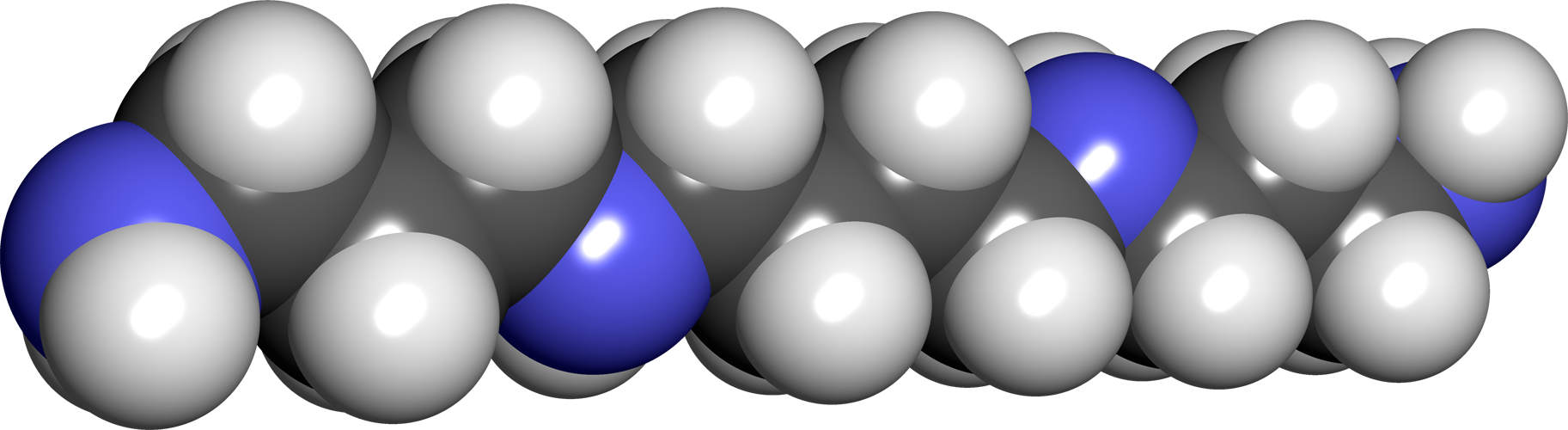
- Spacefill model of spermine

Names
- Preferred IUPAC name N^{1},N^{4}-Bis(3-aminopropyl)butane-1,4-diamine

Identifiers
CAS Number	71-44-3 (free base); 306-67-2 (tetrahydrochloride)
3D model (JSmol)	Interactive image
Beilstein Reference	1750791
ChEBI	CHEBI:15746
ChEMBL	ChEMBL23194
ChemSpider	1072
DrugBank	DB00127
ECHA InfoCard	100.000.686
EC Number	200-754-2
Gmelin Reference	454653
IUPHAR/BPS	710
KEGG	C00750
MeSH	Spermine
PubChem CID	1103
RTECS number	EJ7175000
UNII	2FZ7Y3VOQX (free base); 9CI1570O48 (tetrahydrochloride)
UN number	3259
CompTox Dashboard (EPA)	DTXSID9058781
- InChI: InChI=1S/C10H26N4/c11-5-3-9-13-7-1-2-8-14-10-4-6-12/h13-14H,1-12H2 Key: PFNFFQXMRSDOHW-UHFFFAOYSA-N
- SMILES: NCCCNCCCCNCCCN

Properties
Chemical formula	C_{10}H_{26}N_{4}
Molar mass	202.346 g·mol^{−1}
Appearance	Colourless crystals
Odor	Fishy or like that of semen
Density	917 mg mL^{−1}
Melting point	28 to 30 °C (82 to 86 °F; 301 to 303 K)
Boiling point	150.1 °C; 302.1 °F; 423.2 K at 700 Pa
log P	−0.543

Hazards
- Occupational safety and health (OHS/OSH)
Main hazards	corrosive
- GHS labelling
Pictograms	(GHS05: Corrosive)
Signal word	Danger
Hazard statements	H314
Precautionary statements	P280, P305+P351+P338, P310
Flash point	110 °C (230 °F; 383 K)

Related compounds
Related compounds	Spermidine, Putrescine, Cadaverine, Diethylenetriamine, Norspermidine, Thermospermine
- Except where otherwise noted, data are given for materials in their standard state (at 25 °C [77 °F], 100 kPa). verify (what is ?) Infobox references

Spermine is a polyamine involved in cellular metabolism that is found in all eukaryotic cells. The precursor for synthesis of spermine is the amino acid ornithine. It is an essential growth factor in some bacteria as well. It is found as a polycation at physiological pH. Spermine is associated with nucleic acids and is thought to stabilize helical structure, particularly in viruses. It functions as an intracellular free radical scavenger to protect DNA from free radical attack. Spermine is the chemical primarily responsible for the characteristic odor of semen.

Antonie van Leeuwenhoek first described crystals of spermine phosphate in human semen in 1678. The name spermin was first used by the German chemists Ladenburg and Abel in 1888, and the correct structure of spermine was established in the 1920s, independently by Dudley, Rosenheim, and Starling in England and by Wrede et al. in Germany.

== Derivative ==
A derivative of spermine, N^{1}, N^{12}-bis(ethyl)spermine (also known as BESm) was investigated in the late 1980s along with similar polyamine analogues for its potential as a cancer therapy.

== Biosynthesis ==
Biosynthesis of spermidine and spermine from putrescine. Ado = 5'-adenosyl.

Spermine biosynthesis in animals starts with decarboxylation of ornithine by the enzyme Ornithine decarboxylase in the presence of PLP. This decarboxylation gives putrescine. Thereafter the enzyme spermidine synthase effects two N-alkylation by decarboxy-S-adenosyl methionine. The intermediate is spermidine.

Plants employ additional routes to spermine. In one pathway L-glutamine is the precursor to L-ornithine, after which the synthesis of spermine from L-ornithine follows the same pathway as in animals.

Another pathway in plants starts with decarboxylation of L-arginine to produce agmatine. The imine functional group in agmatine then is hydrolysed by agmatine deiminase, releasing ammonia, converting the guanidine group into a urea. The resulting N-carbamoylputrescine is acted on by a hydrolase to split off the urea group, leaving putrescine. After that the putrescine follows the same pathway to completing the synthesis of spermine.
