= 5′-Methylthioadenosine =

Names
- IUPAC name 5′-S-Methyl-5′-thioadenosine
- Systematic IUPAC name (2R,3R,4S,5S)-2-(6-Amino-9H-purin-9-yl)-5-[(methylsulfanyl)methyl]oxolane-3,4-diol
- Other names: 5′-S-Methyl-5'-thioadenosine; 5′-(Methylthio)-5′-deoxyadenosine; 5′-(Methylthio)adenosine; 5′-Deoxy(methylthio)adenosine; 5′-Deoxy-5′-(methylthio)adenosine; 5′-S-Methylthioadenosine; 9′-(5-Thiomethyl-ribofuranosyl)-adenine; Methylthioadenosine; Vitamin L2

Identifiers
CAS Number	2457-80-9
3D model (JSmol)	Interactive image
ChEBI	CHEBI:17509
ChemSpider	388321
ECHA InfoCard	100.154.727
KEGG	C00170
PubChem CID	439176
UNII	634Z2VK3UQ
CompTox Dashboard (EPA)	DTXSID20179308
- InChI: InChI=1S/C11H15N5O3S/c1-20-2-5-7(17)8(18)11(19-5)16-4-15-6-9(12)13-3-14-10(6)16/h3-5,7-8,11,17-18H,2H2,1H3,(H2,12,13,14)/t5-,7-,8-,11-/m1/s1 Key: WUUGFSXJNOTRMR-IOSLPCCCSA-N; InChI=1/C11H15N5O3S/c1-20-2-5-7(17)8(18)11(19-5)16-4-15-6-9(12)13-3-14-10(6)16/h3-5,7-8,11,17-18H,2H2,1H3,(H2,12,13,14)/t5-,7-,8-,11-/m1/s1 Key: WUUGFSXJNOTRMR-IOSLPCCCBD
- SMILES: CSC[C@H]1O[C@H]([C@H](O)[C@@H]1O)N1C=NC2=C(N)N=CN=C12

Properties
Chemical formula	C_{11}H_{15}N_{5}O_{3}S
Molar mass	297.33 g·mol^{−1}
Melting point	205 °C (401 °F; 478 K)

Hazards
- Lethal dose or concentration (LD, LC)
LD_{50} (median dose)	>1000 mg/kg (mouse, oral)
- Except where otherwise noted, data are given for materials in their standard state (at 25 °C [77 °F], 100 kPa). Infobox references

5′-Methylthioadenosine is S-methyl derivative of the adenosine. It is an intermediate in the methylthioadenosine (MTA) cycle, also known as the methionine salvage pathway, that is universal to aerobic organisms.

== Formation ==
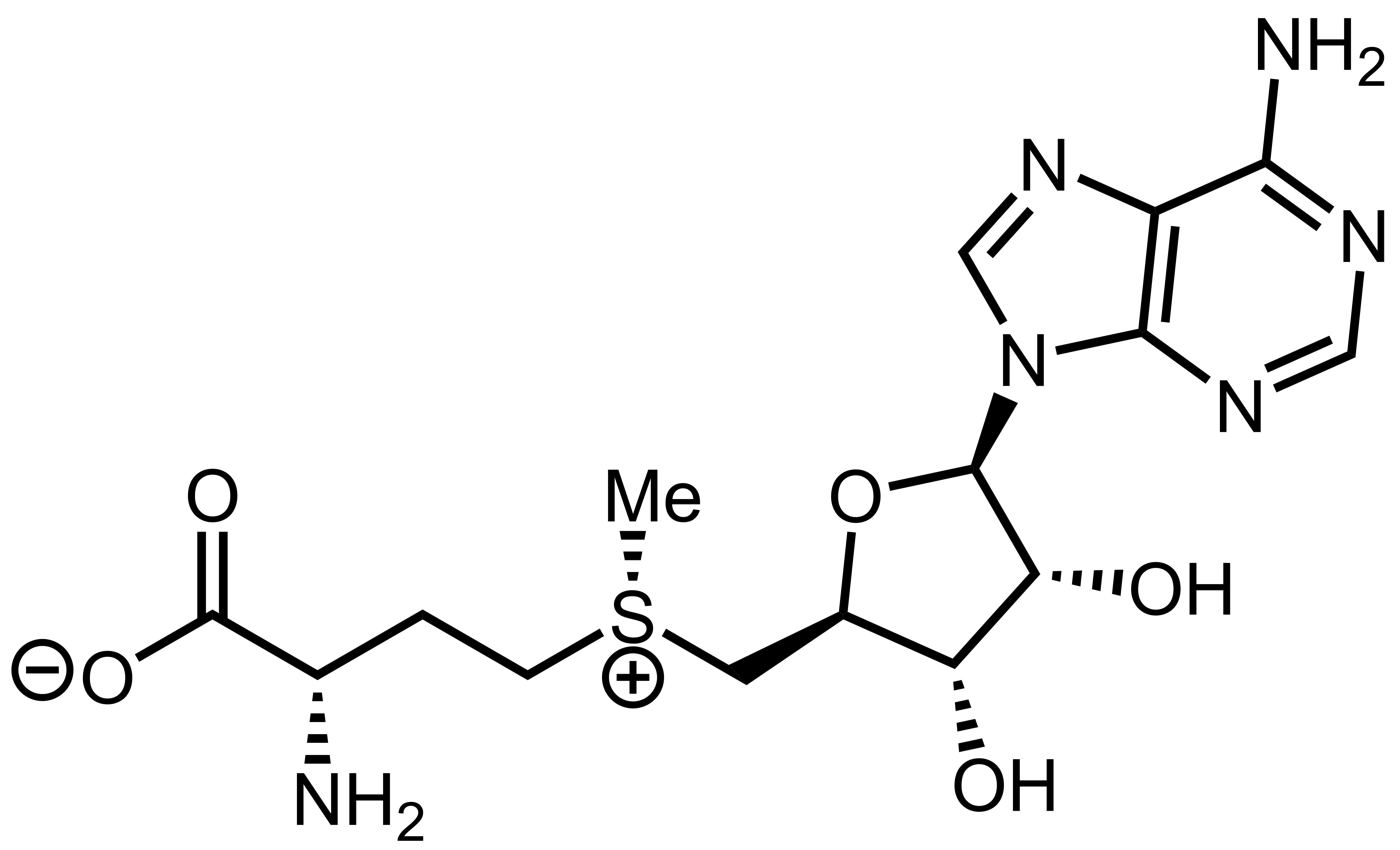
S-adenosyl methionine (SAM) is the precursor to 5′-methylthioadenosine.

The pervasive cofactor S-adenosyl methionine (SAM) is the precursor to 5′-methylthioadenosine. The sulfonium group in SAM can cleave in three ways, one involves loss of CH_{2}CH_{2}CH(NH_{3}^{+})CO_{2}^{−}, generating the title compound.

== History ==
In 1912, an adenine nucleoside was isolated by Hunter et al. from yeast that were grown without phosphorus or sulfur. Later in 1925, that substance was shown by Levene and Sobotkal to be adenylthiomethylpentose.

In 1936, Nakahara et al. did experiments on rats that suggested that vitamin L_{2} deficiency inhibits the ability of female rats for lactation. In 1942, they identified vitamin L_{2} to be adenylthiomethylpentose. Later studies by Folley et al (1942) refuted Nakahara's claims and demonstrated that L2 is not necessary for lactation and thus L_{2} is not considered a vitamin today.

Hecht found in 1937 that the body temperature of rabbits, cats and guinea pigs were lowered by 1 to 2 degrees after he gave them this biochemical at a dose of 0.2 g/kg. Kühn et al. replicated this in guinea pigs in 1941.
