= Ureohydrolase =

Identifiers
- Symbol: Ureohydrolase
- Pfam: PF00491
- InterPro: IPR006035
- PROSITE: PDOC00135
Available protein structures:
- Pfam: structures / ECOD
- PDB: RCSB PDB; PDBe; PDBj
- PDBsum: structure summary
- PDB: PDB: 1cev PDB: 1d3v PDB: 1gq6 PDB: 1gq7 PDB: 1hq5 PDB: 1hqf PDB: 1hqg PDB: 1hqh PDB: 1hqx PDB: 1p8m

A ureohydrolase is a type of hydrolase enzyme. The ureohydrolase superfamily includes arginase (EC 3.5.3.1), agmatinase (EC 3.5.3.11), formiminoglutamase (EC 3.5.3.8) and proclavaminate amidinohydrolase (EC 3.5.3.22). These enzymes share a 3-layer alpha-beta-alpha structure, and play important roles in arginine/agmatine metabolism, the urea cycle, histidine degradation, and other pathways.

== Enzymes ==
=== Arginase ===
Arginase, which catalyses the conversion of arginine to urea and ornithine, is one of the five members of the urea cycle enzymes that convert ammonia to urea as the principal product of nitrogen excretion. There are several arginase isozymes that differ in catalytic, molecular and immunological properties. Deficiency in the liver isozyme leads to argininemia, which is usually associated with hyperammonemia.

=== Agmatinase ===
Agmatinase hydrolyses agmatine to putrescine, the precursor for the biosynthesis of higher polyamines, spermidine and spermine. In addition, agmatine may play an important regulatory role in mammals.

=== Formiminoglutaminase ===
Formiminoglutamase catalyses the fourth step in histidine degradation, acting to hydrolyse N-formimidoyl-L-glutamate to L-glutamate and formamide.

=== Proclavaminate amidinohydrolase ===
Proclavaminate amidinohydrolase is involved in clavulanic acid biosynthesis. Clavulanic acid acts as an inhibitor of a wide range of beta-lactamase enzymes that are used by various microorganisms to resist beta-lactam antibiotics. As a result, this enzyme improves the effectiveness of beta-lactamase antibiotics.
