= Guanidinopropionase =

Class of enzymes

Identifiers
- EC no.: 3.5.3.17
- CAS no.: 68821-77-2

Databases
- BRENDA: enzyme data
- ExPASy: NiceZyme view
- KEGG: enzyme entry
- MetaCyc: metabolic pathway
- Rhea: reactions
- PDB structures: RCSB PDB PDBe PDBsum
- Gene Ontology: AmiGO / QuickGO
Search
- PMC: articles
- PubMed: articles
- NCBI: proteins

Guanidinopropionase (EC 3.5.3.17) is an enzyme characterised from Pseudomonas aeruginosa that catalyzes the chemical reaction:

guanidinopropionic acid
H_{2}O
β-alanine
+
urea

A structural study by X-ray crystallography shows that the enzyme belongs to a superfamily that includes arginase, agmatinase, proclavaminate amidinohydrolase, and formiminoglutamase.

This enzyme is a hydrolase, one acting on carbon-nitrogen bonds other than peptide bonds, specifically in linear amidines. The systematic name of this enzyme class is 3-guanidinopropanoate amidinopropionase. Other names in use include GPase and GPH. It uses manganese as a cofactor.
