= Norspermidine =

- Skeletal formula of norspermidine

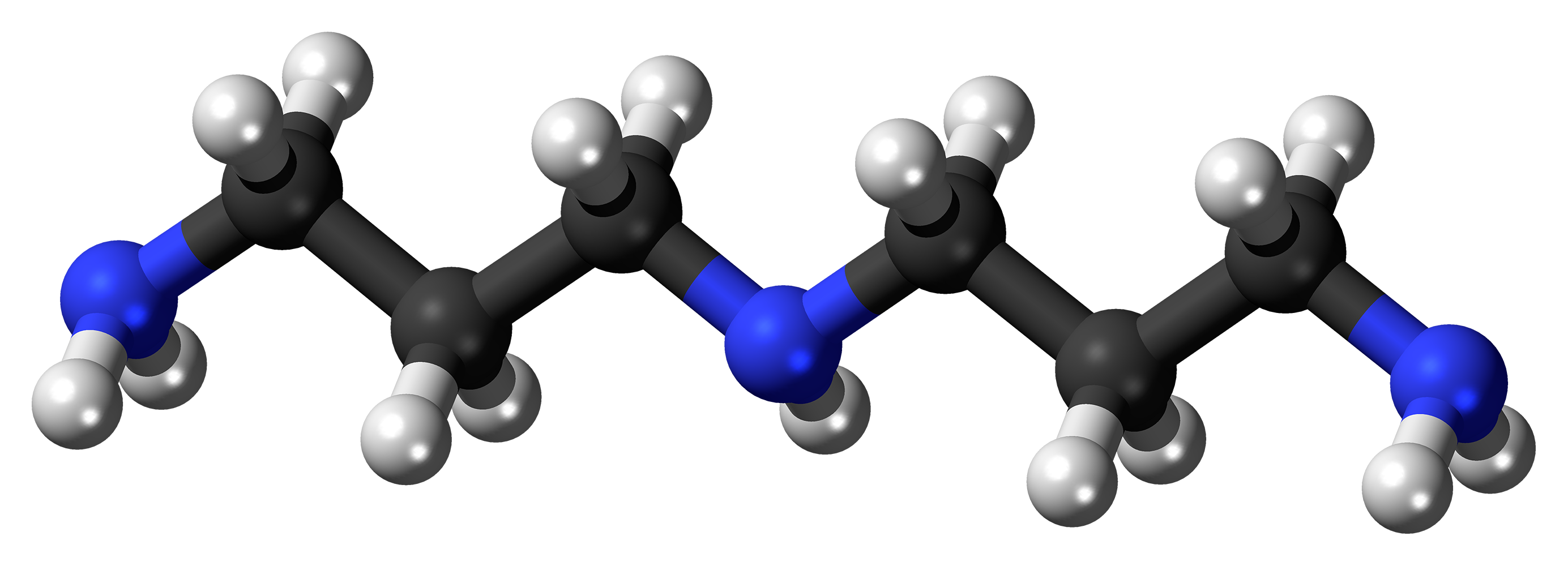

Names
- Preferred IUPAC name N^{1}-(3-Aminopropyl)propane-1,3-diamine

Identifiers
CAS Number	56-18-8
3D model (JSmol)	Interactive image
Beilstein Reference	1071254
ChEBI	CHEBI:16841
ChEMBL	ChEMBL28743
ChemSpider	5729
ECHA InfoCard	100.000.238
EC Number	200-261-2
Gmelin Reference	26839
KEGG	C03375
MeSH	norspermidine
PubChem CID	5942
RTECS number	JL9450000
UNII	RN1144MGND
UN number	2269
CompTox Dashboard (EPA)	DTXSID0025440
- InChI: InChI=1S/C6H17N3/c7-3-1-5-9-6-2-4-8/h9H,1-8H2 Key: OTBHHUPVCYLGQO-UHFFFAOYSA-N
- SMILES: NCCCNCCCN

Properties
Chemical formula	C_{6}H_{17}N_{3}
Molar mass	131.223 g·mol^{−1}
Appearance	Colorless liquid
Odor	Ichtyal, ammoniacal
Density	938 mg mL^{−1}
Melting point	−16 to 0 °C; 3 to 32 °F; 257 to 273 K
Boiling point	240.60 °C; 465.08 °F; 513.75 K
log P	−0.826
Refractive index (n_{D})	1.481–1.482

Hazards
- GHS labelling
Pictograms	(GHS05: Corrosive) (GHS06: Toxic)
Signal word	Danger
Hazard statements	H302, H311, H314, H317, H330
Precautionary statements	P260, P280, P284, P305+P351+P338, P310
Flash point	117 °C (243 °F; 390 K)
Autoignition temperature	280 °C (536 °F; 553 K)
- Lethal dose or concentration (LD, LC)
LD_{50} (median dose)	738 mg kg^{−1} (oral, rat)
Safety data sheet (SDS)	fishersci.com

Related compounds
Related amines	Dipropylamine; Methyl-n-amylnitrosamine; Spermidine
Related compounds	Agmatine
- Except where otherwise noted, data are given for materials in their standard state (at 25 °C [77 °F], 100 kPa). Infobox references

Norspermidine is a polyamine of similar structure to the more common spermidine. Norspermidine has been found to occur naturally in some species of plants, bacteria, and algae.

Norspermidine is being researched for use as a cancer medication.

== Biosynthesis ==
Norspermidine is an aliphatic polyamine. In ϵ-proteobacteria, which are found in human gut microbiota, a combination of two enzymes is used to produce norspermidine from 1,3-diaminopropane. First, carboxynorspermidine synthase catalyses a reductive amination using nicotinamide adenine dinucleotide phosphate (NADPH) as the reducing agent.

1,3-diaminopropane
+ NADPH +
L-aspartic-4-semialdehyde
H^{+}
H_{2}O
carboxynorspermidine
+ NADP^{+}

The intermediate, carboxynorspermidine, is then decarboxylated by carboxynorspermidine decarboxylase:

carboxynorspermidine
CO_{2}
norspermidine
