= ECTA =

ECTA may refer to:

- Econometrica, an academic journal of economics
- European Competitive Telecommunications Association
- Diaminobutyrate acetyltransferase, an enzyme
