= Diaminobutyrate acetyltransferase =

Identifiers
- EC no.: 2.3.1.178

Databases
- IntEnz: IntEnz view
- BRENDA: BRENDA entry
- ExPASy: NiceZyme view
- KEGG: KEGG entry
- MetaCyc: metabolic pathway
- PRIAM: profile
- PDB structures: RCSB PDB PDBe PDBsum
Search
- PMC: articles
- PubMed: articles
- NCBI: proteins

Diaminobutyrate acetyltransferase (EC 2.3.1.178) is an enzyme that catalyzes the chemical reaction

(S)-2,4-diaminobutyric acid
+
acetyl-CoA
N(4)-acetyl-L-2,4-diaminobutyric acid
+ coenzyme A

The two substrates of this enzyme are (S)-2,4-diaminobutyric acid and acetyl-CoA. Its products are N(4)-acetyl-L-2,4-diaminobutyric acid and coenzyme A. The enzyme has been characterised in a number of organisms including Halomonas elongata, Methylomicrobium alcaliphilum and Bacillus pasteurii. The product of the reaction is converted to ectoine by the enzyme ectoine synthase in these species.

Ectoine

This enzyme belongs to the family of transferases, specifically those acyltransferases transferring groups other than aminoacyl groups. The systematic name of this enzyme class is acetyl-CoA:L-2,4-diaminobutanoate N4-acetyltransferase. Other names in common use include L-2,4-diaminobutyrate acetyltransferase, L-2,4-diaminobutanoate acetyltransferase, EctA, diaminobutyric acid acetyltransferase, DABA acetyltransferase, 2,4-diaminobutanoate acetyltransferase, DAB acetyltransferase, DABAcT, and acetyl-CoA:L-2,4-diaminobutanoate 4-N-acetyltransferase.
