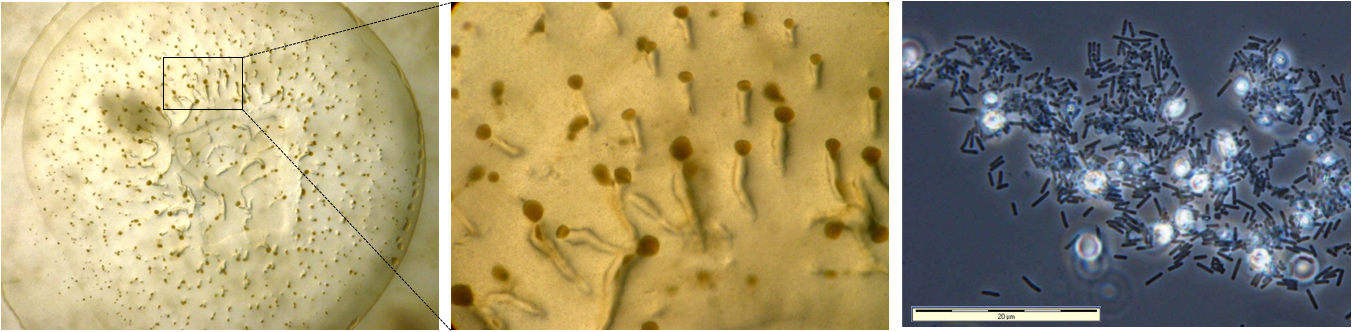

Scientific classification
- Domain: Bacteria
- Kingdom: Pseudomonadati
- Phylum: Myxococcota
- Class: Myxococcia
- Order: Myxococcales
- Family: Nannocystaceae
- Genus: Enhygromyxa
- Species: E. salina

Binomial name
- Enhygromyxa salina Iiukza 2003

= Enhygromyxa =

Species of bacterium

Enhygromyxa salina is a species of marine myxobacteria. It is the only species in the genus Enhygromyxa. Like other members of this order, E. salina is a rod-shaped Gram-negative bacterium that can move by gliding and can form aggregates of cells called fruiting bodies. E. salina is slightly halophilic (salt-tolerant) and can grow at lower temperatures than other marine myxobacteria. Several novel secondary metabolites have been identified in the species, including unusual sterols (which are rarely produced by prokaryotes at all). The species was first described in 2003, based on six strains isolated from samples collected from the coastlines of Japan.

== Characteristics and morphology ==
Enhygromyxa salina cells are straight, rod-shaped, and have blunt ends. Like other myxobacteria, groups of cells can form round fruiting bodies. The species is an obligate aerobe and a chemoorganotroph. Cells are motile and move by gliding. The species is mesophilic and grew best under laboratory conditions in a temperature range of 5-34C, neutral to slightly basic pH and salinity similar to that of seawater, making it slightly halophilic. Compared to other marine myxobacteria, E. salina tolerates lower temperatures. E. salina cells require sodium to grow, as expected for marine bacteria.

== Taxonomy ==
Enhygromyxa salina is the type species and only member of the genus Enhygromyxa, both first described in the same 2003 study. Based on comparisons of the E. salina 16S rRNA genetic sequence to those of other similar organisms, it is most closely related to Plesiocystis pacifica, another marine myxobacterial species also described in 2003 by the same research team. The genus name Enhygromyxa derives from the Greek words enhygro (implying life in moist conditions) and myxa (slime). The specific epithet refers to the species' salt tolerance.

== Metabolism ==
Enhygromyxa salina is a chemoorganotrophic predatory bacterium and can derive energy from decomposing living Gram-negative bacteria such as Escherichia coli. It is an aerobe that uses the menaquinone MK-7 in its electron transport chain.

Marine myxobacteria are relatively uncommon compared to terrestrial myxobacteria. Studies of the salt adaptation of marine myxobacteria have found that P pacifica accumulates exogenous amino acids from its environment as osmoprotectants, in contrast with E. salina, which expresses genes for the synthesis of endogenously produced betaine, ectoine, and hydroxyectoine.

Myxobacteria are known for their ability to produce diverse natural products as secondary metabolites, though terrestrial members of the group are much better characterized than marine myxobacteria. Several types of unusual secondary metabolites have been isolated from E. salina cultures. One class, given the name salimyxins, is composed of incisterols, a rare class of natural products with a spotty phylogenetic distribution; production of any type of sterol is rare for prokaryotic organisms. Another class of natural products isolated from E. salina was termed enhygrolides and are chemically related to compounds known from cyanobacteria of the genus Nostoc. A third compound, salinabromide, was found to possess a novel carbon skeleton not related to known natural products. It is believed to be synthesized through polyketide synthase and halogenase enzymes.

== Genome ==
Myxobacterial genomes typically have high GC content; in E. salina the GC content is 66-67%, slightly lower than its closest relative P. pacifica.

The E. salina genome contains genes with distant sequence similarity to known polyketide synthase genes, often responsible for unusual secondary metabolites with antibiotic activity. In particular, likely halogenases and polyketide synthase III genes have been bioinformatically identified; the latter is unusual in that it primarily is known from plant genomes. Several additional uncharacterized gene clusters with synthetic potential have since been bioinformatically identified.
