= Glucosylglycerol 3-phosphatase =

glucosylglycerol 3-phosphatase

Identifiers
- EC no.: 3.1.3.69

Databases
- IntEnz: IntEnz view
- BRENDA: BRENDA entry
- ExPASy: NiceZyme view
- KEGG: KEGG entry
- MetaCyc: metabolic pathway
- PRIAM: profile
- PDB structures: RCSB PDB PDBe PDBsum
- Gene Ontology: AmiGO / QuickGO
Search
- PMC: articles
- PubMed: articles
- NCBI: proteins

The enzyme glucosylglycerol 3-phosphatase (EC 3.1.3.69) catalyzes the hydrolysis reaction

2-O-(α-D-glucosyl)-sn-glycerol 3-phosphate
H_{2}O
P_{i}
2-O-(α-D-glucopyranosyl)glycerol

In Synechocystis cyanobacteria, the product is an osmoprotectant which provides salt tolerance. The biosynthesis starts with the enzyme glucosylglycerol-phosphate synthase, which provides the starting material for this reaction.

This enzyme belongs to the family of hydrolases, specifically those acting on phosphoric monoester bonds. The systematic name is 2-O-(α-D-glucopyranosyl)-sn-glycerol-3-phosphate phosphohydrolase. This enzyme is also called salt tolerance protein A, StpA.
