= D-arginase =

Identifiers
- EC no.: 3.5.3.10
- CAS no.: 37289-14-8

Databases
- BRENDA: enzyme data
- ExPASy: NiceZyme view
- KEGG: enzyme entry
- MetaCyc: metabolic pathway
- Rhea: reactions
- PDB structures: RCSB PDB PDBe PDBsum
Search
- PMC: articles
- PubMed: articles
- NCBI: proteins

D-arginase (EC 3.5.3.10) is an enzyme with systematic name D-arginine amidinohydrolase. It catalyses the hydrolysis of D-arginine to D-ornithine and urea:

D-arginine
H_{2}O
D-ornithine
+
urea

The substrate range of the enzyme from Arthrobacter species led to its being designated a type of guanidinobutyrase.

== See also ==
- Arginase
