= C6H14N2O =

The molecular formula C_{6}H_{14}N_{2}O (molar mass : 130.19 g/mol) may refer to:

- N-Acetylputrescine
- Methyl-n-amylnitrosamine
