= C4H10N2O2 =

The molecular formula C_{4}H_{10}N_{2}O_{2} may refer to:

- 2,4-Diaminobutyric acid
- β-Methylamino-L-alanine
