= Non-specific polyamine oxidase =

Class of enzymes

Identifiers
- EC no.: 1.5.3.17

Databases
- BRENDA: enzyme data
- ExPASy: NiceZyme view
- KEGG: enzyme entry
- MetaCyc: metabolic pathway
- Rhea: reactions
- PDB structures: RCSB PDB PDBe PDBsum
Search
- PMC: articles
- PubMed: articles
- NCBI: proteins

Non-specific polyamine oxidase (EC 1.5.3.17, polyamine oxidase, Fms1, AtPAO3) is an enzyme with systematic name polyamine:oxygen oxidoreductase (3-aminopropanal or 3-acetamidopropanal-forming). This enzyme catalyses the following chemical reaction

(1) spermine + O_{2} + H_{2}O $\rightleftharpoons$ spermidine + 3-aminopropanal + H_{2}O_{2}
(2) spermidine + O_{2} + H_{2}O $\rightleftharpoons$ putrescine + 3-aminopropanal + H_{2}O_{2}
(3) N^{1}-acetylspermine + O_{2} + H_{2}O $\rightleftharpoons$ spermidine + 3-acetamidopropanal + H_{2}O_{2}
(4) N^{1}-acetylspermidine + O_{2} + H_{2}O $\rightleftharpoons$ putrescine + 3-acetamidopropanal + H_{2}O_{2}

This enzyme is flavoprotein (FAD).
