= ECTC =

ECTC may refer to:

- Ectoine synthase, an enzyme
- East Carolina University
- Expected Cost To Company, Desired Salary, used by some recruiters
