= Acylagmatine amidase =

Class of enzymes

Identifiers
- EC no.: 3.5.1.40
- CAS no.: 39419-74-4

Databases
- BRENDA: enzyme data
- ExPASy: NiceZyme view
- KEGG: enzyme entry
- MetaCyc: metabolic pathway
- Rhea: reactions
- PDB structures: RCSB PDB PDBe PDBsum
- Gene Ontology: AmiGO / QuickGO
Search
- PMC: articles
- PubMed: articles
- NCBI: proteins

Acylagmatine amidase (EC 3.5.1.40) is an enzyme that catalyzes the chemical reaction

benzoylagmatine
H_{2}O
benzoic acid
+
agmatine

The enzyme characterised from a Fusarium species hydrolyses benzoylagmatine to benzoic acid and agmatine.

This enzyme is a hydrolase, one acting on carbon-nitrogen bonds other than peptide bonds, specifically in linear amides. The systematic name of this enzyme class is benzoylagmatine amidohydrolase. Other names in common use include acylagmatine amidohydrolase, and acylagmatine deacylase.
