= SPR741 =

Chemical compound

- Skeletal formula of SPR741

- peptide depiction (DAB = Diaminobutyric acid)

Clinical data
- Other names: NAB741

Legal status
- Legal status: Investigational

Identifiers
- IUPAC name: (2S,3R)-2-Acetamido-3-hydroxy-N-[(2R)-3-hydroxy-1-oxo-1-[[(3S,6S,9S,12S,15R,18S,21S)-6,9,18-tris(2-aminoethyl)-15-benzyl-3-[(1R)-1-hydroxyethyl]-12-(2-methylpropyl)-2,5,8,11,14,17,20-heptaoxo-1,4,7,10,13,16,19-heptazacyclotricos-21-yl]amino]propan-2-yl]butanamide
- CAS Number: 1179330-52-9
- PubChem CID: 53323381
- IUPHAR/BPS: 13250
- UNII: XQ4XZ5Y4KE
- ChEMBL: ChEMBL1631770

Chemical and physical data
- Formula: C_{44}H_{73}N_{13}O_{13}
- Molar mass: 992.146 g·mol^{−1}
- 3D model (JSmol): Interactive image
- SMILES: C[C@H]([C@H]1C(=O)NCC[C@@H](C(=O)N[C@H](C(=O)N[C@@H](C(=O)N[C@H](C(=O)N[C@H](C(=O)N[C@H](C(=O)N1)CCN)CCN)CC(C)C)CC2=CC=CC=C2)CCN)NC(=O)[C@@H](CO)NC(=O)[C@H]([C@@H](C)O)NC(=O)C)O
- InChI: InChI=1S/C44H73N13O13/c1-22(2)19-31-40(66)52-27(11-15-45)36(62)51-29(13-17-47)39(65)57-34(23(3)59)43(69)48-18-14-30(53-42(68)33(21-58)56-44(70)35(24(4)60)49-25(5)61)38(64)50-28(12-16-46)37(63)55-32(41(67)54-31)20-26-9-7-6-8-10-26/h6-10,22-24,27-35,58-60H,11-21,45-47H2,1-5H3,(H,48,69)(H,49,61)(H,50,64)(H,51,62)(H,52,66)(H,53,68)(H,54,67)(H,55,63)(H,56,70)(H,57,65)/t23-,24-,27+,28+,29+,30+,31+,32-,33-,34+,35+/m1/s1; Key:JBFNEVNUGGFPBQ-DDMCRLCFSA-N

SPR741 is an experimental antibiotic related to Polymyxin B. It shows activity against a number of bacterial pathogens, especially Acinetobacter baumannii and Klebsiella pneumoniae, acting as an antibiotic adjuvant which disrupts the outer membrane of Gram-negative bacteria and allows other antibiotics to more effectively penetrate into the cell.
