= N-carbamoylputrescine amidase =

Class of enzymes

Identifiers
- EC no.: 3.5.1.53
- CAS no.: 85030-69-9

Databases
- BRENDA: enzyme data
- ExPASy: NiceZyme view
- KEGG: enzyme entry
- MetaCyc: metabolic pathway
- Rhea: reactions
- PDB structures: RCSB PDB PDBe PDBsum
- Gene Ontology: AmiGO / QuickGO
Search
- PMC: articles
- PubMed: articles
- NCBI: proteins

N-carbamoylputrescine amidase (EC 3.5.1.53) is an enzyme characterised from maize that catalyzes the hydrolysis of N-carbamoylputrescine to putrescine, with ammonia and carbon dioxide as byproducts:

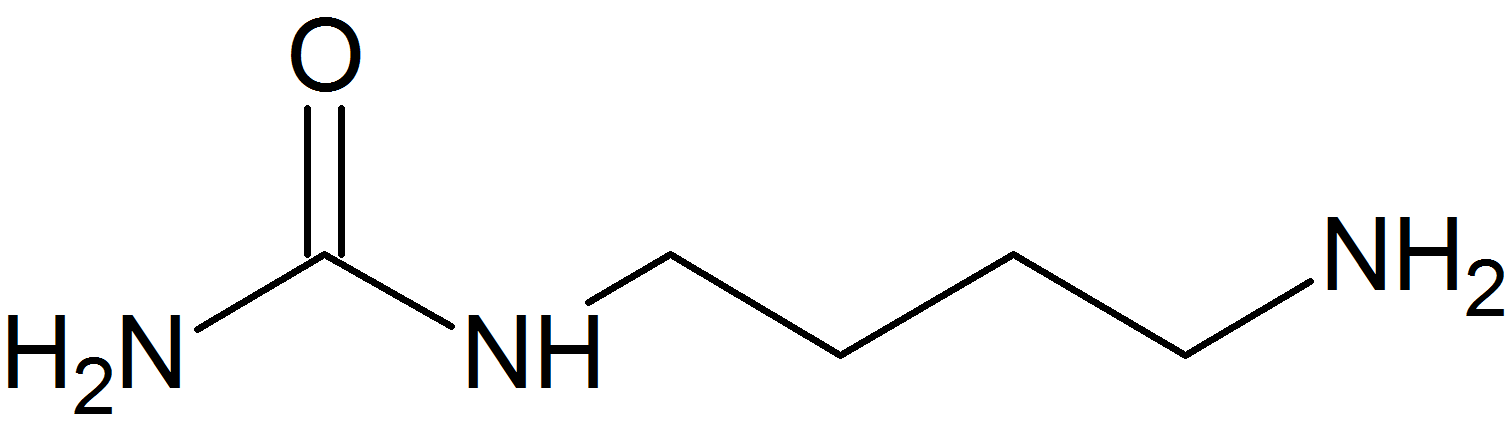
N-carbamoylputrescine
H_{2}O
NH_{3}
putrescine
+ CO_{2}

The reaction is part of the metabolism of the amino acid arginine via agmatine.

This enzyme is a hydrolase, one acting on carbon-nitrogen bonds other than peptide bonds, specifically in linear amides. The systematic name of this enzyme class is N-carbamoylputrescine amidohydrolase. Other names in common use include carbamoylputrescine hydrolase, and NCP.
