= Diaminobutyrate decarboxylase =

Class of enzymes

Identifiers
- EC no.: 4.1.1.86

Databases
- BRENDA: enzyme data
- ExPASy: NiceZyme view
- KEGG: enzyme entry
- MetaCyc: metabolic pathway
- Rhea: reactions
- PDB structures: RCSB PDB PDBe PDBsum
Search
- PMC: articles
- PubMed: articles
- NCBI: proteins

The enzyme diaminobutyrate decarboxylase (EC 4.1.1.86), characterised from Acinetobacter species, catalyzes the decarboxylation of L-2,4-diaminobutyric acid to 1,3-diaminopropane and carbon dioxide:

L-2,4-diaminobutyric acid
CO_{2}
1,3-diaminopropane

Pyridoxal phosphate is used as a cofactor, and the biosynthesis of diamines typically involes such reactions, which can be used for their manufacture. In Acinetobacter baumannii, the starting material is provided by the enzyme diaminobutyrate—2-oxoglutarate transaminase, which is encoded by the same gene.

This enzyme is a lyase, specifically a carboxy-lyase, which cleave carbon-carbon bonds. The systematic name of this enzyme class is L-2,4-diaminobutanoate carboxy-lyase (propane-1,3-diamine-forming). Other names in use include DABA DC, L-2,4-diaminobutyrate decarboxylase, and L-2,4-diaminobutanoate carboxy-lyase.
