= Ectoine =

Names
- Preferred IUPAC name (4S)-2-Methyl-3,4,5,6-tetrahydropyrimidine-4-carboxylic acid
- Other names: Ectoine sodium salt monohydrate; THP(B); RonaCare; Pyrostatin B

Identifiers
CAS Number	96702-03-3
3D model (JSmol)	Interactive image; Interactive image
ChEBI	CHEBI:27592
ChemSpider	112069
KEGG	C06231
PubChem CID	126041
UNII	7GXZ3858RY
CompTox Dashboard (EPA)	DTXSID50869280
- InChI: InChI=1S/C6H10N2O2/c1-4-7-3-2-5(8-4)6(9)10/h5H,2-3H2,1H3,(H,7,8)(H,9,10)/t5-/m0/s1 Key: WQXNXVUDBPYKBA-YFKPBYRVSA-N; InChI=1/C6H10N2O2/c1-4-7-3-2-5(8-4)6(9)10/h5H,2-3H2,1H3,(H,7,8)(H,9,10)/t5-/m0/s1 Key: WQXNXVUDBPYKBA-YFKPBYRVBN
- SMILES: CC1=NCCC(N1)C(=O)O; O=C(O)[C@H]1N\C(=N/CC1)C

Properties
Chemical formula	C_{6}H_{10}N_{2}O_{2}
Molar mass	142.158 g·mol^{−1}
Appearance	White powder
Density	1.568 g/cm^{3}
Solubility in water	Soluble in water

Hazards
NFPA 704 (fire diamond)	1 1 0
- Except where otherwise noted, data are given for materials in their standard state (at 25 °C [77 °F], 100 kPa). verify (what is ?) Infobox references

Ectoine (3,4,5,6-tetrahydro-2-methyl-4-pyrimidinecarboxylic acid) is a natural compound found in several species of bacteria. It is a compatible solute which serves as a protective substance by acting as an osmolyte and thus helps organisms survive extreme osmotic stress. Furthermore it was shown to protect DNA against ionizing and ultraviolet radiation serving as a radical scavenger. Ectoine is found in high concentrations in halophilic microorganisms and confers resistance towards salt and temperature stress. Ectoine was first identified in the microorganism Ectothiorhodospira halochloris, but has since been found in a wide range of Gram-negative and Gram-positive bacteria. Other species of bacteria in which ectoine was found include:

- Brevibacterium linens
- Halomonas elongata
- Marinococcus halophilus
- Pseudomonas stutzeri
- Halomonas titanicae
- Halorhodospira halophila
- Halomonas ventosae

== Biosynthesis ==
Ectoine is synthesized in three successive enzymatic reactions starting from aspartic β-semialdehyde. The genes involved in the biosynthesis are called ectA, ectB and ectC, and they encode the enzymes L-2,4-diaminobutyric acid transaminase, L-2,4-diaminobutyric acid acetyltransferase, and L-ectoine synthase, respectively.

aspartic β-semialdehyde
ectA
2,4-diaminobutyrate
ectB
N-acetyl-2,4-diaminobutyrate
ectC
ectoine

== Use in cosmetics ==
Ectoine is used as an active ingredient in skin care and sun protection products. It stabilizes proteins and other cellular structures and protects the skin from stresses like UV irradiation and dryness.

== Medical use ==
Due to its protein stabilizing properties, ectoine has been evaluated as a topical treatment for hay fever. Effectiveness of a nasal spray containing ectoine is comparable to cromoglycate and is reported to be well tolerated by the patients. It is available over the counter in the European Union.
