= Plesiocystis pacifica =

Scientific classification
- Domain: Bacteria
- Phylum: Pseudomonadota
- Class: Deltaproteobacteria
- Order: Myxococcales
- Family: Nannocystaceae
- Genus: Plesiocystis
- Species: P. pacifica

Binomial name
- Plesiocystis pacifica Iikuza 2003

Species of bacterium

Plesiocystis pacifica is a species of marine myxobacteria. Like other members of this order, P. pacifica is a rod-shaped Gram-negative bacterium that can move by gliding and can form aggregates of cells called fruiting bodies. The species was first described in 2003, based on two strains isolated from samples collected from the Pacific coast of Japan.

== Characteristics and morphology ==
Plesiocystis pacifica cells are straight, rod-shaped, and have blunt ends. Like other myxobacteria, groups of cells can form round fruiting bodies. The species is an obligate aerobe and a chemoorganotroph. Cells are motile and move by gliding. The species is mesophilic and grew best under laboratory conditions in a temperature range of 15-32C, a neutral to slightly basic pH, and salinity similar to that of seawater (making it slightly halophilic). P. pacifica cells require sodium to grow, as expected for marine bacteria.

== Taxonomy ==
Plesiocystis pacifica is the type species and only member of the genus Plesiocystis, both first described in the same 2003 study. Based on comparisons of the P. pacifica 16S rRNA genetic sequence to those of other similar organisms, it is most closely related to bacteria of the genus Nannocystis, specifically Nannocystis exedens. The genus name Plesiocystis derives from the Greek words plesion (neighbor) and cystis (bladder), noting the genus' relationship to Nannocystis. The specific epithet refers to the species' discovery on the Pacific coastline of Japan.

== Metabolism ==
Plesiocystis pacifica is a chemoorganotrophic predatory bacterium and can derive energy from decomposing living Gram-negative bacteria such as Escherichia coli. It is an aerobe that uses oxygen as its terminal electron acceptor in its electron transport chain. It is unusual in using partially saturated menaquinones in this pathway, a characteristic otherwise more common in Gram-positive bacteria. P. pacifica is also unusual in the types of polyunsaturated fatty acids it produces, among which are long-chain forms not otherwise common in myxobacteria (although the quantities of these vary based on cultivation conditions). The significance of this observation is unclear, as these compounds are found mainly in psychrophilic bacteria.

Marine myxobacteria are relatively uncommon compared to terrestrial myxobacteria, such as P. pacifica's relative N. exedens. Studies of the salt adaptation of marine myxobacteria have found that P. pacifica accumulates exogenous amino acids from its environment as osmoprotectants, in contrast with the marine myxobacterium Enhygromyxa salina, which express genes for the synthesis of endogenously produced osmoprotectant molecules.

== Genome ==
Myxobacterial genomes typically have high GC content; in P. pacifica the GC content is 69-70%.

Comparative genomics studies have identified myxobacteria and specifically P. pacifica as possessing an unusual kinome, with a high number of distinct "eukaryotic-like" serine/threonine and tyrosine kinase genes. These kinases are common regulatory proteins in eukaryotes, but are relatively rare in prokaryotes. The functions of these kinases in myxobacteria are unclear. Similar bioinformatic analysis has identified a large number of genes in the P. pacifica genome associated with sterol production, which is quite rare among prokaryotes but ubiquitous in eukaryotes. There is evidence that at least some of the sterol-associated genes in P. pacifica derive from horizontal gene transfer from eukaryotes.
