= Acetylspermidine deacetylase =

Class of enzymes

Identifiers
- EC no.: 3.5.1.48
- CAS no.: 67339-07-5

Databases
- BRENDA: enzyme data
- ExPASy: NiceZyme view
- KEGG: enzyme entry
- MetaCyc: metabolic pathway
- Rhea: reactions
- PDB structures: RCSB PDB PDBe PDBsum
- Gene Ontology: AmiGO / QuickGO
Search
- PMC: articles
- PubMed: articles
- NCBI: proteins

Acetylspermidine deacetylase (EC 3.5.1.48) is an enzyme that catalyzes the chemical reaction

N(8)-acetylspermidine
H_{2}O
spermidine
+ CH_{3}COOH

The enzyme characterised from rat liver hydrolyses N(8)-acetylspermidine to spermidine and acetic acid. The spermidine derivative with the acetyl group at the other end of the molecule (N(1)-acetylspermidine) is not reactive.

This enzyme is a hydrolase, one acting on carbon-nitrogen bonds other than peptide bonds, specifically in linear amides. The systematic name of this enzyme class is N8-acetylspermidine amidohydrolase. Other names in common use include N8-monoacetylspermidine deacetylase, N8-acetylspermidine deacetylase, N-acetylspermidine deacetylase, N1-acetylspermidine amidohydrolase (incorrect), and 8-N-acetylspermidine amidohydrolase.
