= C6H10N2O2 =

The molecular formula C_{6}H_{10}N_{2}O_{2} (molar mass: 142.16 g/mol, exact mass: 142.0742 u) may refer to:

- Piracetam
- Ectoine (1,4,5,6-tetrahydro-2-methyl-4-pyrimidinecarboxylic acid)
