= Diguanidinobutanase =

Class of enzymes

Identifiers
- EC no.: 3.5.3.20
- CAS no.: 125268-65-7

Databases
- BRENDA: enzyme data
- ExPASy: NiceZyme view
- KEGG: enzyme entry
- MetaCyc: metabolic pathway
- Rhea: reactions
- PDB structures: RCSB PDB PDBe PDBsum
- Gene Ontology: AmiGO / QuickGO
Search
- PMC: articles
- PubMed: articles
- NCBI: proteins

Diguanidinobutanase (EC 3.5.3.20) is an enzyme characterised from Pseudomonas putida that catalyzes the hydrolysis of 1,4-diguanidinobutane (arcaine) to agmatine and urea:

arcaine
H_{2}O
agmatine
+
urea

This enzyme is a hydrolase, one acting on carbon-nitrogen bonds other than peptide bonds, specifically in linear amidines. The systematic name of this enzyme class is 1,4-diguanidinobutane amidinohydrolase.
