= Diaminobutyrate—2-oxoglutarate transaminase =

Diaminobutyrate-2-oxoglutarate transaminase

Identifiers
- EC no.: 2.6.1.76
- CAS no.: 196622-96-5

Databases
- IntEnz: IntEnz view
- BRENDA: BRENDA entry
- ExPASy: NiceZyme view
- KEGG: KEGG entry
- MetaCyc: metabolic pathway
- PRIAM: profile
- PDB structures: RCSB PDB PDBe PDBsum
- Gene Ontology: AmiGO / QuickGO
Search
- PMC: articles
- PubMed: articles
- NCBI: proteins

Diaminobutyrate-2-oxoglutarate transaminase (EC 2.6.1.76) is an enzyme that catalyzes the chemical reaction

L-Aspartic-4-semialdehyde
+
Glutamic acid
2,4-Diaminobutyric acid
+
α-Ketoglutaric acid

The two substrates of this enzyme are L-aspartic-4-semialdehyde and glutamic acid. Its products are the (S) enantiomer of 2,4-diaminobutyric acid (DABA) and α-ketoglutaric acid. The product DABA in bacteria is subsequently converted to the osmoprotectant, ectoine. In other organisms including Acinetobacter baumannii and Haemophilus influenzae it is the precursor to 1,3-diaminopropane.

This enzyme belongs to the family of transferases, specifically the transaminases, which transfer nitrogenous groups. The systematic name of this enzyme class is L-2,4-diaminobutanoate:2-oxoglutarate 4-aminotransferase. Other names in common use include L-2,4-diaminobutyrate:2-ketoglutarate 4-aminotransferase, 2,4-diaminobutyrate 4-aminotransferase, diaminobutyrate aminotransferase, DABA aminotransferase, DAB aminotransferase, EctB, diaminibutyric acid aminotransferase, and L-2,4-diaminobutyrate:2-oxoglutarate 4-aminotransferase.
