= Diaminobutyrate—pyruvate transaminase =

Diaminobutyrate-pyruvate transaminase

Identifiers
- EC no.: 2.6.1.46
- CAS no.: 37277-95-5

Databases
- IntEnz: IntEnz view
- BRENDA: BRENDA entry
- ExPASy: NiceZyme view
- KEGG: KEGG entry
- MetaCyc: metabolic pathway
- PRIAM: profile
- PDB structures: RCSB PDB PDBe PDBsum
- Gene Ontology: AmiGO / QuickGO
Search
- PMC: articles
- PubMed: articles
- NCBI: proteins

Diaminobutyrate-pyruvate transaminase (EC 2.6.1.46) is a pyridoxal phosphate-dependent enzyme that catalyzes the reversible chemical reaction

L-2,4-diaminobutanoic acid
+
pyruvic acid
(2S)-2-amino-4-oxobutanoic acid
+
alanine

The two substrates of this enzyme characterised from the genus Xanthomonas are L-2,4-diaminobutanoic acid and pyruvic acid. Its products are (2S)-2-amino-4-oxobutanoic acid and L-alanine.

This enzyme is a transferase, specifically a transaminase, which transfer nitrogenous groups. The systematic name of this enzyme class is L-2,4-diaminobutanoate:pyruvate aminotransferase. Other names in common use include diaminobutyrate-pyruvate aminotransferase, and L-diaminobutyric acid transaminase.
