= Dipropylamine =

- Skeletal formula of dipropylamine

Names
- Preferred IUPAC name N-Propylpropan-1-amine
- Other names (Dipropyl)amine

Identifiers
CAS Number	142-84-7
3D model (JSmol)	Interactive image
Beilstein Reference	505974
ChemSpider	8562
ECHA InfoCard	100.005.060
EC Number	205-565-9
PubChem CID	8902
RTECS number	JL9200000
UNII	60P318IIRY
UN number	2383
CompTox Dashboard (EPA)	DTXSID2025185
- InChI: InChI=1S/C6H15N/c1-3-5-7-6-4-2/h7H,3-6H2,1-2H3 Key: WEHWNAOGRSTTBQ-UHFFFAOYSA-N
- SMILES: CCCNCCC

Properties
Chemical formula	C_{6}H_{15}N
Molar mass	101.193 g·mol^{−1}
Appearance	Colorless liquid
Odor	Ichtyal, ammoniacal
Density	738 mg mL^{−1}
Melting point	−63 °C (−81 °F; 210 K)
Boiling point	109.2 °C (228.6 °F; 382.3 K)
Solubility in diethyl ether	Miscible
Henry's law constant (k_{H})	190 μmol Pa^{−1} kg^{−1}
Refractive index (n_{D})	1.4049

Thermochemistry
Std enthalpy of formation (Δ_{f}H^{⦵}_{298})	−156.1–−153.1 kJ mol^{−1}
Std enthalpy of combustion (Δ_{c}H^{⦵}_{298})	−4.3515–−4.3489 MJ mol^{−1}

Hazards
- GHS labelling
Pictograms	(GHS02: Flammable) (GHS05: Corrosive) (GHS07: Exclamation mark)
Signal word	Danger
Hazard statements	H225, H302, H312, H314, H332
Precautionary statements	P210, P280, P305+P351+P338, P310
Flash point	7 °C (45 °F; 280 K)
Autoignition temperature	280 °C (536 °F; 553 K)
- Lethal dose or concentration (LD, LC)
LD_{50} (median dose)	200–400 mg kg^{−1} (rat)

Related compounds
Related amines	Methyl-n-amylnitrosamine; Norspermidine; Spermidine
Related compounds	Agmatine
- Except where otherwise noted, data are given for materials in their standard state (at 25 °C [77 °F], 100 kPa). verify (what is ?) Infobox references

Dipropylamine is an organic compound with the formula (CH_{3}CH_{2}CH_{2})_{2}NH. It is classified as a secondary amine. It is a colorless liquid with a "fishy" odor. It is a precursor to various herbicides such as trifluralin, oryzalin, and vernolate.

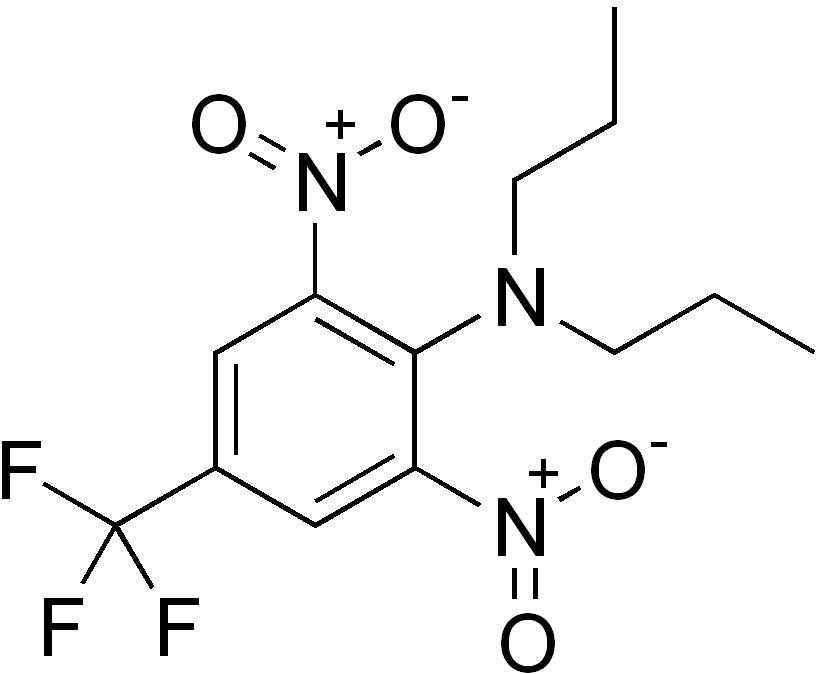
Trifluralin, an herbicide containing a dipropylamino group

== Occurrence ==
Dipropylamine occurs in tobacco leaves and in some industrial wastes.

== Safety ==
Dipropylamine is flammable, toxic, and corrosive. Exposure can cause excitement followed by depression, internal bleeding, dystrophy, and severe irritation.
