= GPH =

GPH may refer to:

- 3GPH, a radio station in Australia
- GamePark Holdings, a South Korean electronics company
- Glycophorin, a protein found on red blood cells
- Grand Pacific Hotel (Fiji)
- Greenslopes Private Hospital, in Brisbane, Australia
- Guangxi Pingguo Haliao F.C., a Chinese association football club
- Guanidinopropionase, an enzyme
- Midwest National Air Center, in Missouri, United States
