= Ectoine synthase =

Identifiers
- EC no.: 4.2.1.108

Databases
- IntEnz: IntEnz view
- BRENDA: BRENDA entry
- ExPASy: NiceZyme view
- KEGG: KEGG entry
- MetaCyc: metabolic pathway
- PRIAM: profile
- PDB structures: RCSB PDB PDBe PDBsum
Search
- PMC: articles
- PubMed: articles
- NCBI: proteins

The enzyme ectoine synthase (EC 4.2.1.108) catalyzes the chemical reaction which forms the osmoprotectant ectoine in many bacteria, including Halomonas elongata, Bacillus pasteurii and Marinococcus halophilus.

N(4)-acetyl-L-2,4-diaminobutyric acid
H_{2}O
ectoine

This enzyme belongs to the family of lyases, specifically the hydro-lyases, which cleave carbon-oxygen bonds. The systematic name of this enzyme class is (2S)-4-acetamido-2-aminobutanoate (L-ectoine-forming). Other names in common use include N-acetyldiaminobutyrate dehydratase, N-acetyldiaminobutanoate dehydratase, L-ectoine synthase, EctC, and 4-N-acetyl-L-2,4-diaminobutanoate hydro-lyase (L-ectoine-forming).
