= Marinococcus halotolerans =

Scientific classification
- Domain: Bacteria
- Kingdom: Bacillati
- Phylum: Bacillota
- Class: Bacilli
- Order: Bacillales
- Family: Bacillaceae
- Genus: Marinococcus
- Species: M. halotolerans

Binomial name
- Marinococcus halotolerans Li et al. 2005

Type strain
- CIP 108945, DSM 16375, KCTC 19045, YIM70157

Species of bacterium

Marinococcus halotolerans is a Gram-positive and aerobic bacterium from the genus Marinococcus which has been isolated from soil from Qinghai in China.
