= Pegzilarginase =

Medication

Clinical data
- Trade names: Loargys
- Other names: AEB-1102, pegzilarginase-nbln
- AHFS/Drugs.com: Monograph
- MedlinePlus: a626051
- License data: US DailyMed: Pegzilarginase
- Routes of administration: Intravenous, subcutaneous
- ATC code: A16AB24 (WHO)

Legal status
- Legal status: CA: ℞-only; US: ℞-only; EU: Rx-only

Identifiers
- CAS Number: 1659310-95-8
- PubChem SID: 405226561
- DrugBank: DB14780
- UNII: 4YV4KW88GD
- KEGG: D11695

Chemical and physical data
- Formula: C_{1554}H_{2492}N_{416}O_{463}S_{6}
- Molar mass: 34603.84 g·mol^{−1}

Pegzilarginase, sold under the brand name Loargys, is a medication used for the treatment of hyperargininemia. Pegzilarginase is an arginine specific enzyme.

The most common side effects include allergic reactions.

Pegzilarginase was authorized for medical use in the European Union in December 2023, and was approved for medical use in the United States in February 2026.

== Medical uses ==
In the EU, pegzilarginase is indicated for the treatment of arginase 1 deficiency, also known as hyperargininemia.

In the US, pegzilarginase is indicated for the treatment of hyperargininemia in people aged two years of age and older with arginase 1 deficiency, in conjunction with dietary protein restriction.

== Society and culture ==
=== Legal status ===
In October 2023, the Committee for Medicinal Products for Human Use of the European Medicines Agency adopted a positive opinion, recommending the granting of a marketing authorization under exceptional circumstances for the medicinal product Loargys, intended for the treatment of hyperargininemia. The applicant for this medicinal product is Immedica Pharma AB. Pegzilarginase was authorized for medical use in the European Union in December 2023.

=== Brand names ===
Pegzilarginase is the international nonproprietary name.

Pegzilarginase is sold under the brand name Loargys.
