= Carboxynorspermidine decarboxylase =

Identifiers
- EC no.: 4.1.1.96

Databases
- IntEnz: IntEnz view
- BRENDA: BRENDA entry
- ExPASy: NiceZyme view
- KEGG: KEGG entry
- MetaCyc: metabolic pathway
- PRIAM: profile
- PDB structures: RCSB PDB PDBe PDBsum
Search
- PMC: articles
- PubMed: articles
- NCBI: proteins

Carboxynorspermidine decarboxylase (EC 4.1.1.96, carboxyspermidine decarboxylase, CANSDC, VC1623 (gene)) is an enzyme with systematic name carboxynorspermidine carboxy-lyase (bis(3-aminopropyl)amine-forming). This enzyme catalyses two related decarboxylation reactions.

carboxynorspermidine
CO_{2}
norspermidine
carboxyspermidine
CO_{2}
spermidine

The enzyme contains pyridoxal 5'-phosphate. It acts on biosynthetic intermediates which are produced by the enzyme carboxynorspermidine synthase and together these are the main way that bacteria which form the gut microbiota in humans make spermidine and norspermidine.
