= Arginase-2 =

Enzyme found in humans

ARG2
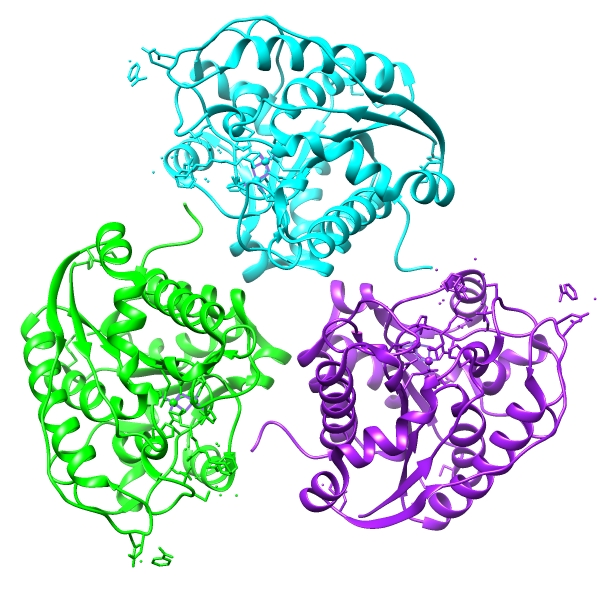

Identifiers
- Aliases: ARG2, arginase 2
- External IDs: OMIM: 107830; MGI: 1330806; GeneCards: ARG2
Available structures
PDB	Ortholog search: PDBe RCSB
PDB	List of PDB id codes 1PQ3, 4HZE, 4I06, 4IE2, 4IE3, 4IXU, 4IXV
Enzyme activity
EC #	BRENDA	ExPASy	KEGG	MetaCyc
3.5.3.1	↗	↗	↗	↗

Gene location (Human)
Chr.	Chromosome 14 (human)
Band	14q24.1	Start	67,619,920 bp
Band	14q24.1	End	67,651,708 bp

Gene location (Mouse)
Chr.	Chromosome 12 (mouse)
Band	12|12 C3	Start	79,177,551 bp
Band	12|12 C3	End	79,203,075 bp
RNA expression pattern
Bgee	Human / Mouse (ortholog); Top expressed in: tendon of biceps brachii; oocyte; renal medulla; human kidney; secondary oocyte; islet of Langerhans; pituitary gland; beta cell; mucosa of paranasal sinus; anterior pituitary / Top expressed in: duodenum; granulocyte; primary oocyte; lobe of prostate; jejunum; zygote; transitional epithelium of urinary bladder; hair follicle; secondary oocyte; intestinal villus; More reference expression data
BioGPS	n/a
Gene ontology
Molecular function	hydrolase activity, acting on carbon-nitrogen (but not peptide) bonds, in linear amidines; arginase activity; hydrolase activity; metal ion binding; manganese ion binding
Cellular component	mitochondrial matrix; mitochondrion; cytoplasm
Biological process	urea cycle; ureteric bud development; nitric oxide biosynthetic process; striated muscle contraction; arginine metabolic process; negative regulation of type 2 immune response; negative regulation of tumor necrosis factor production; negative regulation of macrophage inflammatory protein 1 alpha production; negative regulation of chemokine (C-C motif) ligand 4 production; negative regulation of chemokine (C-C motif) ligand 5 production; negative regulation of defense response to bacterium; regulation of reactive oxygen species biosynthetic process; negative regulation of activated CD8-positive, alpha-beta T cell apoptotic process; negative regulation of CD4-positive, alpha-beta T cell proliferation; positive regulation of cellular senescence; adaptive immune response; immune system process; innate immune response; arginine catabolic process to ornithine
Sources:Amigo / QuickGO
Orthologs
Databases	NCBI: entry; OMA: entry
Species	Human	Mouse
Entrez	384	11847
Ensembl	ENSG00000081181	ENSMUSG00000021125
UniProt	P78540	O08691
RefSeq (mRNA)	NM_001172	NM_009705
RefSeq (protein)	NP_001163	NP_033835
Location (UCSC)	Chr 14: 67.62 – 67.65 Mb	Chr 12: 79.18 – 79.2 Mb
PubMed search
- Wikidata
View/Edit Human	View/Edit Mouse

Arginase-2 is an enzyme that in humans is encoded by the ARG2 gene. As its name suggests, arginase-2 functions as an arginase.

== Function ==
Arginase catalyzes the hydrolysis of arginine to ornithine and urea. At least two isoforms of mammalian arginase exists (types I and II, this enzyme) which differ in their tissue distribution, subcellular localization, immunologic crossreactivity and physiologic function. The type II isoform encoded by this gene, is located in the mitochondria and expressed in extra-hepatic tissues, especially kidney. The physiologic role of this isoform is poorly understood; it is thought to play a role in nitric oxide and polyamine metabolism. Transcript variants of the type II gene resulting from the use of alternative polyadenylation sites have been described.
