= Plesiocystis =

Scientific classification
- Domain: Bacteria
- Phylum: Pseudomonadota
- Class: Deltaproteobacteria
- Order: Myxococcales
- Family: Nannocystaceae
- Genus: Plesiocystis Iizuka et al. 2003

Type species
- Plesiocystis pacifica Iizuka et al. 2003

Species
- Plesiocystis pacifica

Genus of bacteria

Plesiocystis is a genus of myxobacteria. It is a monotypic taxon containing only its type species, Plesiocystis pacifica. Both the genus and the species were first described in 2003, based on two strains isolated from samples collected from the Pacific coast of Japan.

== Description ==
Cells of Plesiocystis species are straight, rod-shaped, and have blunt ends. They move by bacterial gliding and can form aggregates of cells known as fruiting bodies. They have distinctive cellular metabolism featuring, among other characteristics, partially saturated menaquinone (MK-8(H2)), polyunsaturated fatty acid production, and an absence of hydroxy fatty acids. Like typical myxobacteria, they have high GC content.

== Taxonomy and history ==
The genus Plesiocystis was first described in 2003 on the basis of two strains of a single species, Plesiocystis pacifica, and remains a monotypic taxon. Originally placed in the suborder Soranginae, reclassification has since assigned this taxon to the suborder Nannocystineae. The genus name is derived from the Greek words plesion (neighbor) and cystis (bladder), noting the genus' relationship to another genus of myxobacteria, Nannocystis.
