= Marinococcus salis =

Scientific classification
- Domain: Bacteria
- Kingdom: Bacillati
- Phylum: Bacillota
- Class: Bacilli
- Order: Bacillales
- Family: Bacillaceae
- Genus: Marinococcus
- Species: M. salis

Binomial name
- Marinococcus salis Vishnuvardhan et al. 2017

Type strain
- CGMCC 1.15385, KCTC 33743, LMG 29101, 5M, 5ZM

Species of bacterium

Marinococcus salis is a Gram-positive, halophilic, coccoid-shaped, facultative anaerobic and motile bacterium from the genus of Marinococcus which has been isolated from salt marsh from Surajbari in India.
