= Methyl-n-amylnitrosamine =

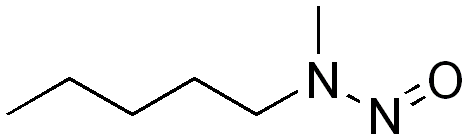
- Skeletal formula of methyl-n-amylnitrosamine

Names
- Preferred IUPAC name Methyl(pentyl)nitrous amide

Identifiers
CAS Number	13256-07-0
3D model (JSmol)	Interactive image
ChEBI	CHEBI:140674
ChEMBL	ChEMBL352469
ChemSpider	24041
MeSH	N-amyl-N-methylnitrosamine
PubChem CID	25805
UNII	U9D5PXJ785
CompTox Dashboard (EPA)	DTXSID30157617
- InChI: InChI=1S/C6H14N2O/c1-3-4-5-6-8(2)7-9/h3-6H2,1-2H3 Key: KSFCDINBDBFFSI-UHFFFAOYSA-N
- SMILES: CCCCCN(C)N=O

Properties
Chemical formula	C_{6}H_{14}N_{2}O
Molar mass	130.191 g·mol^{−1}
Appearance	Yellow, transparent liquid
log P	1.542

Related compounds
Related amines	Dipropylamine; Norspermidine; Spermidine
Related compounds	Agmatine
- Except where otherwise noted, data are given for materials in their standard state (at 25 °C [77 °F], 100 kPa). verify (what is ?) Infobox references

Methyl-n-amylnitrosamine (MNAN) is a potential carcinogen It is metabolized in the liver by the enzyme CYP2A6.
