= Carboxynorspermidine synthase =

Identifiers
- EC no.: 1.5.1.43

Databases
- IntEnz: IntEnz view
- BRENDA: BRENDA entry
- ExPASy: NiceZyme view
- KEGG: KEGG entry
- MetaCyc: metabolic pathway
- PRIAM: profile
- PDB structures: RCSB PDB PDBe PDBsum
Search
- PMC: articles
- PubMed: articles
- NCBI: proteins

Carboxynorspermidine synthase (EC 1.5.1.43, carboxynorspermidine dehydrogenase, carboxyspermidine dehydrogenase, CASDH, CANSDH) is an enzyme with systematic name carboxynorspermidine:NADP^{+} oxidoreductase. This enzyme catalyses chemical reactions classified as reductive aminations, using nicotinamide adenine dinucleotide phosphate (NADPH) as the reducing agent.

1,3-Diaminopropane
+ NADPH +
L-Aspartic-4-semialdehyde
H^{+}
H_{2}O
Carboxynorspermidine
+ NADP^{+}

The enzyme can also act on putrescine, which has one extra CH_{2} in the diamine component, to give carboxyspermidine. Vibrio cholerae uses this enzyme in combination with carboxynorspermidine decarboxylase to make spermidine and norspermidine. This sequence is the dominant pathway to spermidine used by gut microbiota in humans.
