= Agmatine deiminase =

InterPro Family

Identifiers
- EC no.: 3.5.3.12
- CAS no.: 37289-17-1

Databases
- BRENDA: enzyme data
- ExPASy: NiceZyme view
- KEGG: enzyme entry
- MetaCyc: metabolic pathway
- Rhea: reactions
- PDB structures: RCSB PDB PDBe PDBsum
- Gene Ontology: AmiGO / QuickGO
Search
- PMC: articles
- PubMed: articles
- NCBI: proteins

Agmatine deiminase (EC 3.5.3.12) is an enzyme characterised from maize and Lathyrus sativus that catalyzes the hydrolysis of agmatine to N-carbamoylputrescine and ammonia:

agmatine
H_{2}O
NH_{3}
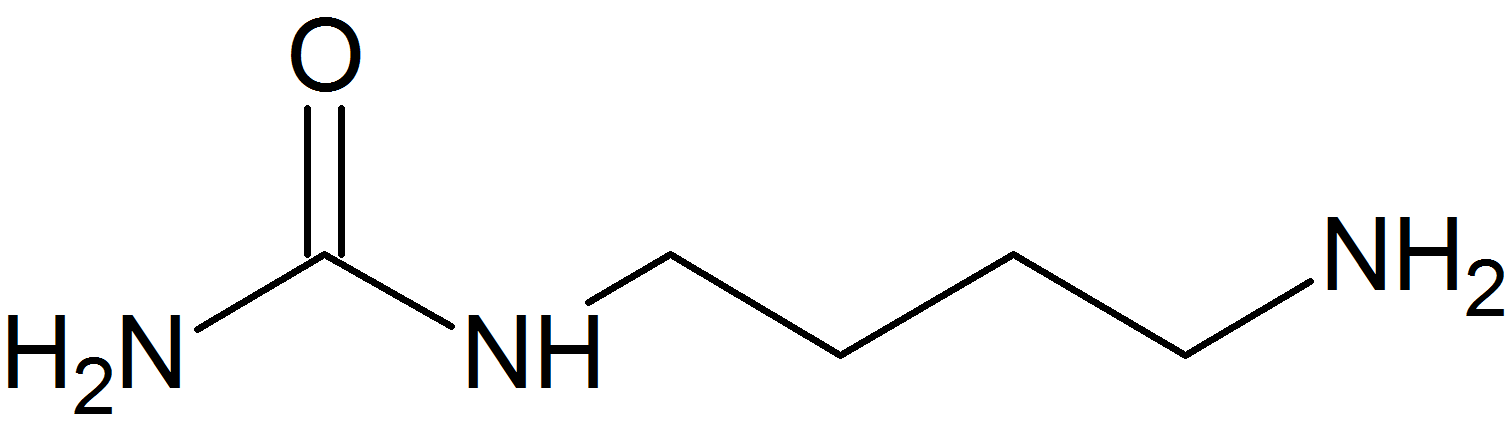
N-carbamoylputrescine

The enzyme has also been found in bacteria. It has a role in gut homeostasis.

This enzyme is a hydrolase, one acting on carbon-nitrogen bonds other than peptide bonds, specifically in linear amidines. The systematic name of this enzyme class is agmatine iminohydrolase. This enzyme is also called agmatine amidinohydrolase.

== Structural studies ==
As of late 2007, 4 structures have been solved for this class of enzymes, with PDB accession codes PDB: 1VKP, PDB: 2EWO, PDB: 2JER, and PDB: 2Q3U.
