= Marinococcus luteus =

Scientific classification
- Domain: Bacteria
- Kingdom: Bacillati
- Phylum: Bacillota
- Class: Bacilli
- Order: Bacillales
- Family: Bacillaceae
- Genus: Marinococcus
- Species: M. luteus

Binomial name
- Marinococcus luteus Wang et al. 2009

Type strain
- CCTCC AA 208014, KCTC 13214, YIM 91094

Species of bacterium

Marinococcus luteus is a Gram-positive, aerobic and motile bacterium from the genus of Marinococcus which has been isolated from the Barkol Lake in Xinjiang in China.
