= Marinococcus tarijensis =

Scientific classification
- Domain: Bacteria
- Kingdom: Bacillati
- Phylum: Bacillota
- Class: Bacilli
- Order: Bacillales
- Family: Bacillaceae
- Genus: Marinococcus
- Species: M. tarijensis

Binomial name
- Marinococcus tarijensis Balderrama et al. 2013

Type strain
- CECT 8130, DSM 28023, LMG 26930, SR-1

Synonyms
- Marinococcus tarijense

Species of bacterium

Marinococcus tarijensis is a Gram-positive, coccoid-shaped and moderately halophilic bacterium from the genus of Marinococcus which has been isolated from a salt crystal from a salt mine in Tarija in Bolivia.
