= Dibutylamine =

- Skeletal formula of dibutylamine

Names
- Preferred IUPAC name N-Butylbutan-1-amine
- Other names (Dibutyl)amine; Dibutylamine (deprecated)

Identifiers
CAS Number	111-92-2
3D model (JSmol)	Interactive image
Beilstein Reference	506001
ChemSpider	7856
ECHA InfoCard	100.003.565
EC Number	203-921-8
MeSH	dibutylamine
PubChem CID	8148
RTECS number	HR7780000
UNII	2194M2LA21
UN number	2248
CompTox Dashboard (EPA)	DTXSID7024952
- InChI: InChI=1S/C8H19N/c1-3-5-7-9-8-6-4-2/h9H,3-8H2,1-2H3 Key: JQVDAXLFBXTEQA-UHFFFAOYSA-N
- SMILES: CCCCNCCCC

Properties
Chemical formula	C_{8}H_{19}N
Molar mass	129.247 g·mol^{−1}
Appearance	Colorless liquid
Odor	Fishy, ammoniacal
Density	767 mg mL^{−1}
Melting point	−61.90 °C; −79.42 °F; 211.25 K
Boiling point	137 to 177 °C; 278 to 350 °F; 410 to 450 K
Solubility in water	4.7 g L^{−1}
Vapor pressure	340 Pa
Henry's law constant (k_{H})	110 mol Pa^{−1} kg^{−1}
Magnetic susceptibility (χ)	−103.7·10^{−6} cm^{3}/mol
Refractive index (n_{D})	1.417

Thermochemistry
Heat capacity (C)	292.9 J^{−1} K mol^{−1}
Std enthalpy of formation (Δ_{f}H^{⦵}_{298})	−214.8 to −209.8 kJ mol^{−1}
Std enthalpy of combustion (Δ_{c}H^{⦵}_{298})	−5.6534 to −5.6490 MJ mol^{−1}

Hazards
- GHS labelling
Pictograms	(GHS02: Flammable) (GHS07: Exclamation mark)
Signal word	Warning
Hazard statements	H226, H302, H312, H332
Precautionary statements	P280
Flash point	40 °C (104 °F; 313 K)
Autoignition temperature	312 °C (594 °F; 585 K)
Explosive limits	1.1–10%
- Lethal dose or concentration (LD, LC)
LD_{50} (median dose)	360 mg kg^{−1} (oral, rat)

Related compounds
Related amines	Spermidine; Iproheptine
- Except where otherwise noted, data are given for materials in their standard state (at 25 °C [77 °F], 100 kPa). verify (what is ?) Infobox references

Dibutylamine is a colorless fluid with a fishy odor. It is an amine used as a corrosion inhibitor, in the manufacturing of emulsifiers, and as a flotation agent. It is flammable and toxic.
