= Arginase-1 =

Enzyme found in humans

ARG1
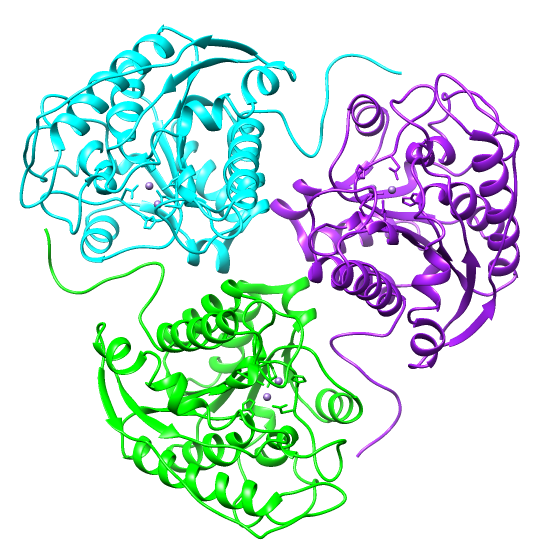

Identifiers
- Aliases: ARG1, arginase 1
- External IDs: OMIM: 608313; MGI: 88070; GeneCards: ARG1
Available structures
| PDB | Ortholog search: PDBe RCSB |
| PDB | List of PDB id codes 1WVA, 1WVB, 2AEB, 2PHA, 2PHO, 2PLL, 2ZAV, 3DJ8, 3E6K, 3E6V, 3F80, 3GMZ, 3GN0, 3KV2, 3LP4, 3LP7, 3MFV, 3MFW, 3MJL, 3SJT, 3SKK, 3TF3, 3TH7, 3THE, 3THH, 3THJ, 4FCI, 4FCK, 4GSM, 4GSV, 4GSZ, 4GWC, 4GWD, 4HWW, 4HXQ, 4IE1 |
Enzyme activity
| EC # | BRENDA | ExPASy | KEGG | MetaCyc |
|---|---|---|---|---|
| 3.5.3.1 | ↗ | ↗ | ↗ | ↗ |

Gene location (Human)
| Chr. | Chromosome 6 (human) |
| Band | 6q23.2 | Start | 131,470,832 bp |
| Band | 6q23.2 | End | 131,584,332 bp |

Gene location (Mouse)
| Chr. | Chromosome 10 (mouse) |
| Band | 10|10 A4 | Start | 24,791,119 bp |
| Band | 10|10 A4 | End | 24,803,382 bp |
RNA expression pattern
| Bgee | Human / Mouse (ortholog); Top expressed in: right lobe of liver; human penis; skin of arm; trabecular bone; bone marrow; vulva; bone marrow cell; skin of leg; skin of hip; skin of abdomen / Top expressed in: left lobe of liver; gallbladder; cervix; parotid gland; superior surface of tongue; esophagus; primitive streak; somite; corneal stroma; lacrimal gland; More reference expression data |
| BioGPS | n/a |
Gene ontology
| Molecular function | arginase activity; manganese ion binding; hydrolase activity, acting on carbon-nitrogen (but not peptide) bonds, in linear amidines; metal ion binding; hydrolase activity; protein binding |
| Cellular component | cytoplasm; cytosol; mitochondrial outer membrane; soma; neuron projection; extracellular exosome; nucleus; extracellular region; azurophil granule lumen; specific granule lumen; extracellular space |
| Biological process | cellular response to interleukin-4; cellular response to transforming growth factor beta stimulus; response to selenium ion; response to amino acid; response to cadmium ion; positive regulation of endothelial cell proliferation; maternal process involved in female pregnancy; lung development; urea cycle; female pregnancy; response to steroid hormone; cellular response to glucagon stimulus; ageing; response to peptide hormone; response to zinc ion; arginine catabolic process; arginine metabolic process; response to vitamin E; protein homotrimerization; cellular response to dexamethasone stimulus; response to vitamin A; arginine catabolic process to ornithine; response to lipopolysaccharide; response to manganese ion; response to wounding; response to axon injury; collagen biosynthetic process; response to amine; liver development; response to methylmercury; cellular response to lipopolysaccharide; response to herbicide; cellular response to hydrogen peroxide; mammary gland involution; neutrophil degranulation; negative regulation of T cell proliferation; defense response to protozoan; negative regulation of activated T cell proliferation; negative regulation of interferon-gamma-mediated signaling pathway; positive regulation of neutrophil mediated killing of fungus; negative regulation of T-helper 2 cell cytokine production; adaptive immune response; immune system process; innate immune response |
Sources:Amigo / QuickGO
Orthologs
| Databases | NCBI: entry; OMA: entry |
| Species | Human | Mouse |
| Entrez | 383 | 11846 |
| Ensembl | ENSG00000118520 | ENSMUSG00000019987 |
| UniProt | P05089 | Q61176 |
| RefSeq (mRNA) | NM_000045; NM_001244438; NM_001369020 | NM_007482 |
| RefSeq (protein) | NP_000036; NP_001231367; NP_001355949 | NP_031508 |
| Location (UCSC) | Chr 6: 131.47 – 131.58 Mb | Chr 10: 24.79 – 24.8 Mb |
| PubMed search |
- Wikidata
| View/Edit Human | View/Edit Mouse |

Arginase-1 is a protein which in humans is encoded by the ARG1 gene. This is the final enzyme in the urea cycle which converts nitrogen-waste like ammonia into less toxic urea for excretion in urine.

== Function ==
Arginase catalyzes the hydrolysis of arginine to ornithine and urea. In addition to arginase-1, there also exists a second type arginase-2, which differs in its tissue distribution, subcellular localization, immunologic crossreactivity and physiologic function. The type I isoform encoded by this gene, is a cytosolic enzyme and expressed predominantly in the liver as a component of the urea cycle. Inherited deficiency of this enzyme results in argininemia, an autosomal recessive disorder characterized by hyperammonemia. Two transcript variants encoding different isoforms have been found for this gene.
