= Marinococcus =

Scientific classification
- Domain: Bacteria
- Kingdom: Bacillati
- Phylum: Bacillota
- Class: Bacilli
- Order: Bacillales
- Family: Bacillaceae
- Genus: Marinococcus; Hao et al. 1985

Type species
- Marinococcus halophilus (Novitsky & Kushner 1976) Hao, Kocur & Komagata 1985

Species
- M. halophilus; M. halotolerans; "M. jeotgali"; M. luteus; "M. salidurans"; M. salis; M. tarijensis

Genus of bacteria

Marinococcus is a Gram-positive, strictly aerobic, chemolithoautotrophic and non-spore-forming genus of bacteria from the family of Bacillaceae.

== Phylogeny ==
The currently accepted taxonomy is based on the List of Prokaryotic names with Standing in Nomenclature (LPSN) and National Center for Biotechnology Information (NCBI).

16S rRNA based LTP_10_2024

- Marinococcus
  - M. halophilus (Novitsky & Kushner 1976) Hao, Kocur & Komagata 1985
  - - M. salis Reddy et al. 2017
    - - M. tarijensis Balderrama-Subieta et al. 2013
      - - M. halotolerans Li et al. 2005
        - M. luteus Wang et al. 2009

120 marker proteins based GTDB 09-RS220

- Marinococcus
  - M. halophilus
  - - M. halotolerans
    - M. luteus

== See also ==
- List of Bacteria genera
- List of bacterial orders
