= 2,4-Diaminobutyric acid =

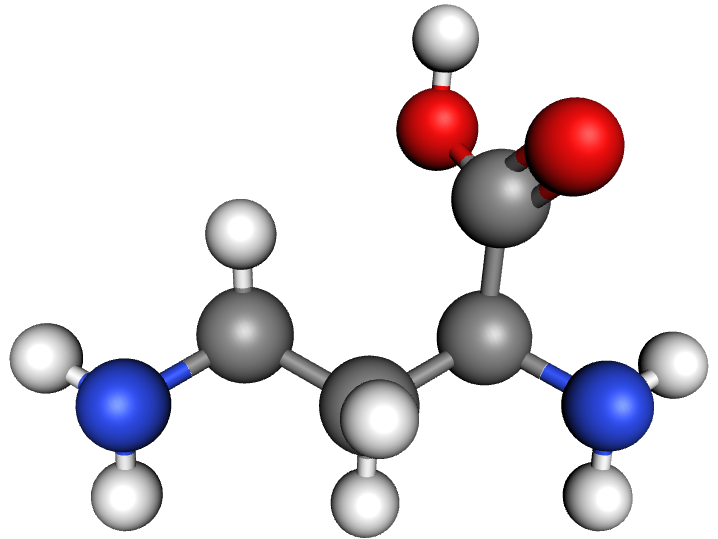

Names
- Preferred IUPAC name 2,4-Diaminobutanoic acid
- Other names α,γ-diaminobutanoic acid

Identifiers
CAS Number	305-62-4
3D model (JSmol)	Interactive image
ChEBI	CHEBI:64307
ChEMBL	ChEMBL307931
ChemSpider	457
ECHA InfoCard	100.005.607
EC Number	206-166-2
PubChem CID	470
UNII	92V7KM11ZK
CompTox Dashboard (EPA)	DTXSID80862749
- InChI: Key: OGNSCSPNOLGXSM-UHFFFAOYSA-N; InChI=1S/C4H10N2O2/c5-2-1-3(6)4(7)8/h3H,1-2,5-6H2,(H,7,8)
- SMILES: C(CN)C(C(=O)O)N

Properties
Chemical formula	C_{4}H_{10}N_{2}O_{2}
Molar mass	118.136 g·mol^{−1}

Pharmacology
Drug class	GABA-T inhibitor; GABA reuptake inhibitor
- Except where otherwise noted, data are given for materials in their standard state (at 25 °C [77 °F], 100 kPa). Infobox references

2,4-Diaminobutyric acid, also known as DABA, is GABA-T non-competitive inhibitor and a GABA reuptake inhibitor. In many bacteria, its (S) enantiomer is a natural product which is an intermediate to the osmoprotectant, ectoine.

== Mechanism of action ==
DABA's main action is being an inhibitor of GABA transaminase, an enzyme that converts GABA back to glutamate. When the enzyme is inhibited, this conversion cannot happen, therefore, GABA levels are elevated.

It has also been observed that 2,4-diaminobutyric acid is a GABA reuptake inhibitor. This action further elevates levels of GABA.

== Toxicity ==
In addition to being a neurotoxin, DABA can also cause liver damage.

Its potential as an anticonvulsant is unclear, it has been shown to have anticonvulsant properties against picrotoxin, but over the long term, it could paradoxically cause convulsions.

== Biosynthesis and metabolism ==
The (S) enantiomer of DABA is a natural product which is an intermediate in many bacteria to the osmoprotectant, ectoine. It is produced by the enzyme diaminobutyrate-2-oxoglutarate transaminase that produces it from L-aspartic-4-semialdehyde and glutamic acid. It has been found in Halomonas elongata and Bacillus pasteurii.

L-Aspartic-4-semialdehyde
+
Glutamic acid
2,4-Diaminobutyric acid
+
α-Ketoglutaric acid

In other organisms including Acinetobacter baumannii and Haemophilus influenzae, DABA is the precursor to 1,3-diaminopropane.
