= Osmolyte =

Organic compounds that influence the properties of biological fluids

Osmolytes are low-molecular-weight organic compounds that influence the properties of biological fluids. Osmolytes are a class of organic molecules that play a significant role in regulating osmotic pressure and maintaining cellular homeostasis in various organisms, particularly in response to environmental stressors. Their primary role is to maintain the integrity of cells by affecting the viscosity, melting point, and ionic strength of the aqueous solution. When a cell swells under external osmotic pressure, membrane channels open and allow efflux of osmolytes carrying water, restoring normal cell volume.

These molecules are involved in counteracting the effects of osmotic stress, which occurs when there are fluctuations in the concentration of solutes (such as ions and sugars) inside and outside cells. Osmolytes help cells adapt to changing osmotic conditions, thereby ensuring their survival and functionality. Osmolytes also interact with the constituents of the cell, e.g., they influence protein folding. Common osmolytes include amino acids, sugars and polyols, methylamines, methylsulfonium compounds, and urea.

== Case studies ==
Natural osmolytes that can act as osmoprotectants include trimethylamine N-oxide (TMAO), dimethylsulfoniopropionate, sarcosine, betaine, glycerophosphorylcholine, myo-inositol, taurine, glycine, and others. Bacteria accumulate osmolytes for protection against a high osmotic environment. The osmolytes are neutral non-electrolytes, except in bacteria that can tolerate salts. In humans, osmolytes are of particular importance in the renal medulla.

Osmolytes are present in the cells of fish and function to protect the cells from water pressure. As the osmolyte concentration in fish cells scales linearly with pressure and therefore depth, osmolytes have been used to calculate the maximum depth at which a fish can survive. Fish cells reach a maximum concentration of osmolytes at depths of approximately 26,900 feet (8,200 meters), and no fish has ever been observed beyond 27,349 feet (8,336 meters).
