= Glucosylglycerol-phosphate synthase =

Class of enzymes

Identifiers
- EC no.: 2.4.1.213

Databases
- IntEnz: IntEnz view
- BRENDA: BRENDA entry
- ExPASy: NiceZyme view
- KEGG: KEGG entry
- MetaCyc: metabolic pathway
- PRIAM: profile
- PDB structures: RCSB PDB PDBe PDBsum
Search
- PMC: articles
- PubMed: articles
- NCBI: proteins

In enzymology, a glucosylglycerol-phosphate synthase (EC 2.4.1.213) is an enzyme that catalyzes the chemical reaction

ADP-glucose + sn-glycerol 3-phosphate $\rightleftharpoons$ 2-(beta-D-glucosyl)-sn-glycerol 3-phosphate + ADP

Thus, the two substrates of this enzyme are ADP-glucose and sn-glycerol 3-phosphate, whereas its two products are 2-(beta-D-glucosyl)-sn-glycerol 3-phosphate and ADP.

This enzyme belongs to the family of glycosyltransferases, specifically the hexosyltransferases. The systematic name of this enzyme class is ADP-glucose:sn-glycerol-3-phosphate 2-beta-D-glucosyltransferase.
