= Argininemia =

- Other names: Arginase deficiency
- Arginine
- Specialty: Neurology, medical genetics, endocrinology
- Symptoms: Lethargy, Dehydration
- Causes: Mutations in the ARG1 gene
- Diagnostic method: Urinary orotic acid concentration
- Treatment: Limited protein intake, sodium benzoate

Argininemia is an autosomal recessive urea cycle disorder where a deficiency of the enzyme arginase causes a buildup of arginine and ammonia in the blood. Ammonia, which is formed when proteins are broken down in the body, is toxic if levels become too high; the nervous system is especially sensitive to the effects of excess ammonia.

== Signs and symptoms ==
The presentation of argininemia, in those that are affected, is consistent with the following:

- Lethargy
- Dehydration
- Hypotonia
- Stunted growth
- Microcephaly
- Seizures

== Genetics ==
Argininemia has an autosomal recessive pattern of inheritance.

Mutations in the ARG1 gene cause argininemia, which belongs to a class of genetic diseases called urea cycle disorders. The urea cycle is a sequence of reactions that occurs in liver cells (hepatocytes). This cycle processes excess nitrogen, generated when protein is used by the body, making urea that is excreted via the kidneys.

The ARG1 gene provides instructions for making an enzyme called arginase, this enzyme controls the last steps of the urea cycle, which produces urea by extracting nitrogen from arginine. In people with arginase deficiency, arginase is missing, and arginine is not broken down properly. consequently, urea cannot be produced and excess nitrogen accumulates in the blood in the form of ammonia. Ammonia and arginine are thought to cause neurological problems and other symptoms of arginase deficiency.

This condition is an autosomal recessive disorder, which means the defective gene is located on an autosome, and two copies of the defective gene are required to inherit the disorder.

Both parents of an individual with an autosomal recessive disorder are carriers of one copy of the gene, but usually do not have the disorder.

== Diagnosis ==
The diagnosis for argininemia can usually be done using fetal blood sample. One can look for the following indicators as to the presence of the condition:

- Plasma ammonia concentration.
- Urinary orotic acid concentration
- Red blood cell arginase enzyme activity (measurement)

== Treatment ==
Glycerol phenylbutyrate

The treatment for people with argininemia includes:

- Sodium benzoate
- Sodium phenylbutyrate
- Carglumic acid
- Glycerol phenylbutyrate
- Palonosetron
- Ondansetron hydrochloride

Pegzilarginase (Loargys) was approved for medical use in the European Union in December 2023.
