= Marinococcus halophilus =

Scientific classification
- Domain: Bacteria
- Kingdom: Bacillati
- Phylum: Bacillota
- Class: Bacilli
- Order: Caryophanales
- Family: Bacillaceae
- Genus: Marinococcus
- Species: M. halophilus

Binomial name
- Marinococcus halophilus (Novitsky and Kushner 1976) Hao et al. 1985

Type strain
- ATCC 27964, CCM 2706, CIP 104759, CIP 104819, DSM 20408, H5, HK 718, IAM 12844, JCM 2479, KCTC 2843, LMG 17439, NBRC 102359, NCIMB 13496, NRC 14033, NRCC14033, T.J. Novitsky 14033, VKM Ac-1985

Synonyms
- Planococcus halophilus

Species of bacterium

Marinococcus halophilus is a Gram-positive and halophilic bacterium from the genus of Marinococcus which has been isolated from a salted mackerel. Marinococcus halophilus produces ectoine.
