= Guanidinobutyrase =

Class of enzymes

Identifiers
- EC no.: 3.5.3.7
- CAS no.: 9013-69-8

Databases
- BRENDA: enzyme data
- ExPASy: NiceZyme view
- KEGG: enzyme entry
- MetaCyc: metabolic pathway
- Rhea: reactions
- PDB structures: RCSB PDB PDBe PDBsum
- Gene Ontology: AmiGO / QuickGO
Search
- PMC: articles
- PubMed: articles
- NCBI: proteins

Guanidinobutyrase (EC 3.5.3.7) is an enzyme characterised from Pseudomonas species that catalyzes the hydrolysis of 4-guanidinobutyric acid to γ-aminobutyric acid (GABA) and urea:

4-guanidinobutyric acid
H_{2}O
GABA
+
urea

The reaction is part of the catabolism of the amino acid, arginine.

This enzyme is a hydrolase, one acting on carbon-nitrogen bonds other than peptide bonds, specifically in linear amidines. The systematic name of this enzyme class is 4-guanidinobutanoate amidinohydrolase. Other names in common use include gamma-guanidobutyrase, 4-guanidinobutyrate amidinobutyrase, gamma-guanidinobutyrate amidinohydrolase, G-Base, GBH, and guanidinobutyrate ureahydrolase. It uses manganese as a cofactor.
