= European Competitive Telecommunications Association =

Established in 1998, ECTA is the leading pan-European telecoms association promoting market liberalisation and competition in the European communications sector, fostering ‘competition and open access’ and developing policy by representing ‘new entrant’ interests to European institutions and Government bodies. ECTA seeks to create confidence for investors through clear and consistent regulation to unlock the growth potential of Europe’s businesses.

ECTA represents more than 100 companies, including leaders in the following market segments throughout Europe:

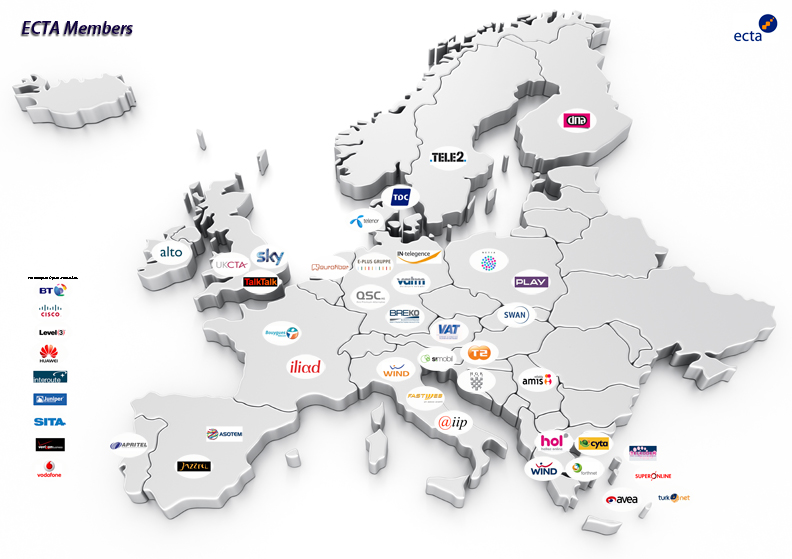
Map of ECTA Members across Europe

1. Alternative providers of consumer broadband and triple-play

- First to launch Internet dial-up
- First to launch triple play, first to launch high speed broadband ADSL2+
- Early/Major investors in FttP (FttB/H)

2. Providers of pan-European/global services to businesses

- First to launch IP-VPN, first to launch Ethernet services
- Early/Major investors in FttP (FttO)

3. Challenger mobile/wireless network operators and service providers

ECTA members are some of the primary innovators in implementation of advanced telecommunications and broadband services

== History ==
The European Competitive Telecommunications Association was formed in 1998 by Robert J. Dombkowski and Elizabeth J. Schumacher, co-founders of MCN, UK, a wholesale telecommunications company. The founding Board of Directors included high ranking executives of the major telecom players in Europe including Robert Dombkowski, Chairman of the Board, MCN, UK, Nick Jeffries of Cable and Wireless, Michael Potter venture capitalist of Paradigm Ventures specialized in telecom start-ups and film director of Orphans of Apollo, Hans Gerber of SITA-Equant, Gustav Schaefer of Unisource Carrier Services, Ian Ashby of Lucent Technologies, Claude Simpson, the president of Immix Telecom (ECTA Member of the Year, 1999), Holland Taylor of USA GlobalLink, and Michael Rhodes of Coudert Brothers. Elizabeth Schumacher served as the first Executive Director of the organization for several years then co-founded the CHA (Colocation & Web Hosting Association), in Europe.

Prior to 1987, the European telecommunications market consisted predominantly of monopolies or telecommunications organizations (TO's) such as BT, France Telecom and Deutsche Telekom. In 1987, the European Union adopted the 1987 Green Paper that essentially stated it was in Europe's best interests to overhaul the current system and liberalize telecommunications services. As a result, from 1988 to 1998 the European Commission adopted multiple directives that obligated member states to open markets for equipment, telecom services, value-added, data services, satellite, mobile and voice to competition.

Member States set up national regulatory agencies (NRA's) that oversaw these directives and developed policies and procedures for telecommunications organizations to follow. The directives provided a framework for the EU commission to ensure compliance and take judicial action when necessary. In 1990 the Open Network Provision (ONP) Framework Directive was adopted by the EU that established regulations for open access to the existing infrastructure and networks, interconnection and 'fair pricing' for resellers.

ECTA was established as a result of restrictive practices by former monopolies to limit activities by resellers to access networks and obtain fair pricing. Committees were established within the organization to collectively respond to new EU directives and written and 'unwritten' policies that were carried out by NRA's. ECTA responded to numerous proposed directives and called for regulations to be developed to better protect reseller interests and encourage enforcement in the spirit of the original 1987 Green Paper. ECTA has contributed white papers and had input into many policy telecom policies since its inception in 1997.

ECTA also serves as a forum for carriers and resellers to meet and discuss openly issues that are in the interests of the parties. ECTA has also served to educate the telecommunications market, providing information and market research on European telecommunications as well as a market forum for new products and services.

== Aims and objectives ==
- Assist and encourage market liberalisation and competition
- Represent the telecommunications industry to key government and regulatory bodies
- Maintain a forum for networking and business development throughout Europe
- Assist new market entrants through pro-competitive policies
- Continually reflect the dynamic nature of the telecommunications industry

=== Core principles ===
- Consumers are best protected by competition
- Service development is driven by consumer choice
- Regulation should create confidence
- Tariffs should be reasonable and straightforward
- Regulators should not pick winners or losers
- Incumbents must not be allowed to prevent competition
- Pan-European solutions are needed for Pan-European problems

=== Board of directors 2016 ===
- Gijs Phoelich, General Counsel & Company Secretary, Eurofiber Netherlands BV (Chairman)
- Martin Witt, CEO, 1&1 Telecommunication SE (Vice Chairman)
- Antonis Tzortzakakis, Chief Fixed Telephony Officer & New Business, WIND Hellas Telecommunications, S.A (Treasurer)
- Antonello Conte, Board Member, AIIP
- Emmanuel Forest, Executive Vice President Institutional Affairs, Bouygues Telecom
- Ilse van der Haar, Group Head of Regulatory Affairs, Tele2 AB
- Jacek Nieweglowski, Chief Strategy Officer, PLAY
- Massimo La Rovere, Head of Regulatory, Antitrust and EU Affairs, Wind Telecomunicazioni SpA
- Tiziana Talevi, Director Regulatory Affairs, Fastweb SpA

ECTA holds two events a year to discuss the latest developments in electronic communications and digital issues as a whole. The list of past ECTA events and conferences can be found on their website.

In March 2015, ECTA sponsored a conference in presence of Vice-President of the European Commission Andrus Ansip. The title of this conference was "Creating Europe’s Digital Highways: Competition, Innovation and Investment in High-speed Broadband". The statements of the speakers as well as their video interviews including the speech from Marvin Ammori from the Centre for Internet and Society at Stanford Law School can be found on website.

The current priority of the European Commission is to foster investments in telecom infrastructures in order to build a Connected Digital Single Market. Vice-President Andrus Ansip, released on 6 May with Commissioner Günther Oettinger a Digital Single Market Strategy which ECTA CEOs welcomed in an open letter.

More about ECTA and ECTA's role in moulding the European telecommunications market can be found on their website website.
