= Spermidine =

- Skeletal formula of spermidine

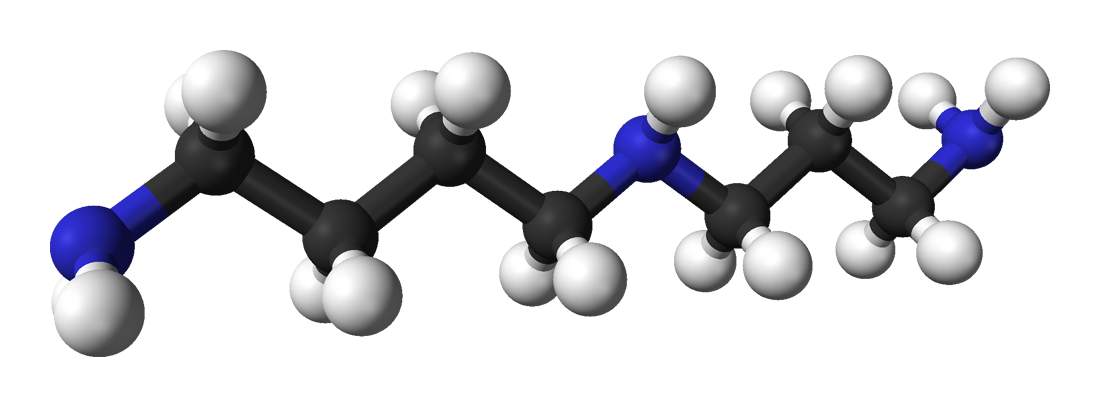
- Ball and stick model of spermidine

Names
- Preferred IUPAC name N^{1}-(3-Aminopropyl)butane-1,4-diamine

Identifiers
CAS Number	124-20-9 (free base); 334-50-9 (trihydrochloride)
3D model (JSmol)	Interactive image
Beilstein Reference	1698591
ChEBI	CHEBI:16610
ChEMBL	ChEMBL19612
ChemSpider	1071
DrugBank	DB03566
ECHA InfoCard	100.004.264
EC Number	204-689-0
Gmelin Reference	454510
IUPHAR/BPS	2390
KEGG	C00315
MeSH	Spermidine
PubChem CID	1102
RTECS number	EJ7000000
UNII	U87FK77H25 (free base); 1O14BED398 (trihydrochloride)
UN number	2735
CompTox Dashboard (EPA)	DTXSID4036645
- InChI: InChI=1S/C7H19N3/c8-4-1-2-6-10-7-3-5-9/h10H,1-9H2 Key: ATHGHQPFGPMSJY-UHFFFAOYSA-N
- SMILES: NCCCCNCCCN

Properties
Chemical formula	C_{7}H_{19}N_{3}
Molar mass	145.250 g·mol^{−1}
Appearance	Colourless liquid
Odor	Fishy, ammoniacal
Density	925 mg mL^{−1}
Melting point	22 to 25 °C (72 to 77 °F; 295 to 298 K)
Solubility in water	145 g L^{−1} (at 20 °C)
log P	−0.504
UV-vis (λ_{max})	260 nm
Absorbance	0.1
Refractive index (n_{D})	1.479

Hazards
- GHS labelling
Pictograms	(GHS05: Corrosive)
Signal word	Danger
Hazard statements	H314
Precautionary statements	P280, P305+P351+P338, P310
Flash point	112 °C (234 °F; 385 K)

Related compounds
Related amines	Dipropylamine; Methyl-n-amylnitrosamine; Norspermidine; Dibutylamine; Iproheptine
- Except where otherwise noted, data are given for materials in their standard state (at 25 °C [77 °F], 100 kPa). Infobox references

Spermidine is a polyamine compound (C_{7}H_{19}N_{3}) originally isolated from semen and also found in ribosomes and living tissues and has various metabolic functions in organisms.

== Function ==
Spermidine synchronizes an array of biological processes, (such as Ca^{2+}, Na^{+}, K^{+} -ATPase) thus maintaining membrane potential and controlling intracellular pH and volume. Spermidine regulates biological processes, such as Ca^{2+} influx by glutamatergic N-methyl-D-aspartate receptor (NMDA receptor), which has been associated with nitric oxide synthase (NOS) and cGMP/PKG pathway activation and a decrease of Na^{+},K^{+}-ATPase activity in cerebral cortex synaptosomes.

Spermidine is a longevity agent in mammals due to various mechanisms of action, which are just beginning to be understood. Autophagy is the main mechanism at the molecular level, but evidence has been found for other mechanisms, including inflammation reduction, lipid metabolism, and regulation of cell growth, proliferation, and death. Spermidine has been theorized to promote autophagy via the MAPK pathway by inhibiting phosphorylation of raf, or possibly by inhibiting cytosolic autophagy-related protein acetylation by EP300 and thereby increasing acetylation of tubulin.

Spermidine is known to regulate plant growth, assisting the in vitro process of transcribing RNA, and inhibition of NOS. Also, spermidine is a precursor to other polyamines, such as spermine and thermospermine, some of which contribute to tolerance against drought and salinity in plants.

Spermidine has been tested and discovered to encourage hair shaft elongation and lengthen hair growth. Spermidine has also been found to "upregulate expression of the epithelial stem cell-associated keratins K15 and K19, and dose-dependently modulated K15 promoter activity in situ and the colony forming efficiency, proliferation and K15 expression of isolated human K15-GFP+ cells in vitro."

== Biosynthesis ==
Biosynthesis of spermidine and spermine from putrescine. Ado = 5'-adenosyl.

Spermidine is an aliphatic polyamine. In plants and some bacteria, spermidine synthase (SPDS) catalyzes its formation from putrescine. It is a precursor to other polyamines, such as spermine and its structural isomer thermospermine.

Many of the organisms that make up the gut microbiota in humans do not contain the SPDS enzyme, for example the ϵ-proteobacteria. Instead, they use a combination of two enzymes to produce spermidine from putrescine. First, carboxynorspermidine synthase catalyses a reductive amination using nicotinamide adenine dinucleotide phosphate (NADPH) as the reducing agent.

putrescine + NADPH +
L-aspartic-4-semialdehyde
H^{+}
H_{2}O
carboxyspermidine
+ NADP^{+}

The intermediate, carboxyspermidine, is then decarboxylated by carboxynorspermidine decarboxylase:

carboxyspermidine
CO_{2}
spermidine

== Biochemical actions ==
Spermidine's known actions include:

- Inhibits neuronal nitric oxide synthase (nNOS)
- Binds and precipitates DNA
- Polyamine plant growth regulator

== Sources ==
Good dietary sources of spermidine are aged cheese, mushrooms, soy products, legumes, corn, and whole grains. Spermidine is plentiful in a Mediterranean diet. For comparison: The spermidine content in human seminal plasma varies between approx. 15 and 50 mg/L (mean 31 mg/L).

Food	Spermidine mg/kg	notes & refs
Wheat germ	243	
Soybean, dried	207	Japanese
Cheddar, 1yr old	199	
Soybean, dried	128	German
Mushroom	89	Japanese
Rice bran	50	
Chicken liver	48	
Green peas	46	
Mango	30	
Chickpea	29	
Cauliflower (cooked)	25	
Broccoli (cooked)	25	

Note: spermidine content varies by source and age. See ref for details.

In grains, the endosperm contains most of the spermidine. One of the best known grain dietary sources is wheat germ, containing as much as 243 mg/kg.

== Uses ==
- Spermidine can be used in electroporation while transferring the DNA into the cell under the electrical impulse. May be used for purification of DNA-binding proteins.
- Spermidine is also used, along with calcium chloride, for precipitating DNA onto microprojectiles for bombardment with a gene gun.
- Spermidine has also been reported to protect the heart from aging and prolong the lifespan of mice, while in humans it was correlated with lower blood pressure. It also was found to reduce the amount of aging in yeast, flies, worms, and human immune cells by inducing autophagy.
- Spermidine may play a role in male and female fertility. Fertile men have higher spermidine levels than men who are infertile, and spermidine supplementation has been shown to help maintain a healthy hormone balance and reduce oxidative stress.
- Spermidine is commonly used for in vitro molecular biology reactions, particularly, in vitro transcription by phage RNA polymerases, in vitro transcription by human RNA polymerase II, and in vitro translation.
- Spermidine increases specificity and reproducibility of Taq-mediated PCR by neutralizing and stabilizing the negative charge on DNA phosphate backbone.
