= Agmatinase =

Enzyme found in humans

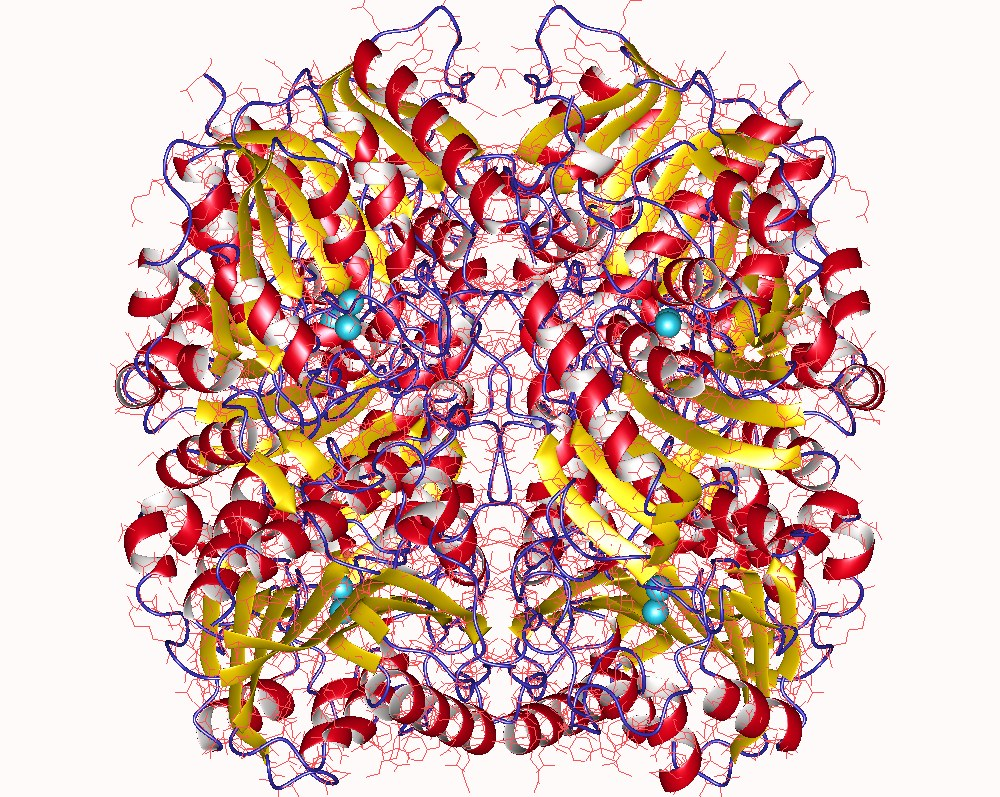
- Agmatinase hexamer, Deinococcus radiodurans

Identifiers
- EC no.: 3.5.3.11
- CAS no.: 37289-16-0

Databases
- IntEnz: IntEnz view
- BRENDA: BRENDA entry
- ExPASy: NiceZyme view
- KEGG: KEGG entry
- MetaCyc: metabolic pathway
- PRIAM: profile
- PDB structures: RCSB PDB PDBe PDBsum
- Gene Ontology: AmiGO / QuickGO
Search
- PMC: articles
- PubMed: articles
- NCBI: proteins

In enzymology, an agmatinase (EC 3.5.3.11) is an enzyme that catalyzes the chemical reaction

agmatine
H_{2}O
H_{2}O
putrescine
+
urea

Thus, the two substrates of this enzyme are agmatine and H_{2}O, whereas its two products are putrescine and urea.

This enzyme belongs to the family of hydrolases, those acting on carbon-nitrogen bonds other than peptide bonds, specifically in linear amidines. The systematic name of this enzyme class is agmatine amidinohydrolase. Other names in common use include agmatine ureohydrolase. This enzyme participates in urea cycle and metabolism of amino groups.

== Genetics ==
AGMAT

Identifiers
- Aliases: AGMAT, Agmatinase
- External IDs: OMIM: 617887; MGI: 1923236; HomoloGene: 99855; GeneCards: AGMAT; OMA:AGMAT - orthologs

Gene location (Human)
Chr.	Chromosome 1 (human)
Band	1p36.21	Start	15,571,699 bp
Band	1p36.21	End	15,585,051 bp

Gene location (Mouse)
Chr.	Chromosome 4 (mouse)
Band	4|4 D3	Start	141,473,983 bp
Band	4|4 D3	End	141,486,574 bp
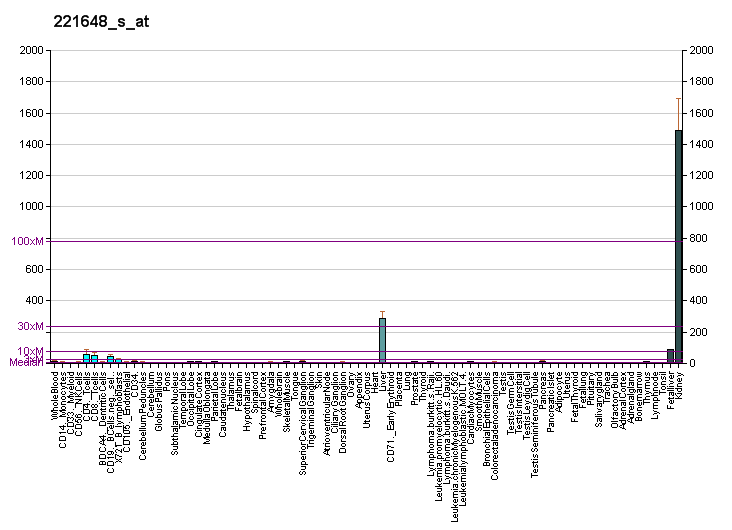
RNA expression pattern
Bgee	Human / Mouse (ortholog); Top expressed in: glomerulus; kidney tubule; metanephric glomerulus; renal medulla; buccal mucosa cell; human kidney; jejunal mucosa; liver; vastus lateralis muscle; mucosa of colon / Top expressed in: left lobe of liver; epithelium of small intestine; motor neuron; duodenum; Paneth cell; fetal liver hematopoietic progenitor cell; jejunum; habenula; migratory enteric neural crest cell; morula; More reference expression data
BioGPS	More reference expression data
Gene ontology
Molecular function	hydrolase activity, acting on carbon-nitrogen (but not peptide) bonds, in linear amidines; hydrolase activity; metal ion binding; agmatinase activity
Cellular component	mitochondrion
Biological process	putrescine biosynthetic process; agmatine biosynthetic process; spermidine biosynthetic process; putrescine biosynthetic process from arginine
Sources:Amigo / QuickGO
Orthologs
Species	Human	Mouse
Entrez	79814	75986
Ensembl	ENSG00000116771	ENSMUSG00000040706
UniProt	Q9BSE5	A2AS89
RefSeq (mRNA)	NM_024758	NM_001081408; NM_001378862
RefSeq (protein)	NP_079034	NP_001074877; NP_001365791
Location (UCSC)	Chr 1: 15.57 – 15.59 Mb	Chr 4: 141.47 – 141.49 Mb
PubMed search
- Wikidata
View/Edit Human	View/Edit Mouse

In humans, the enzyme is encoded by the AGMAT gene.

== Structural studies ==
As of late 2007, 5 structures have been solved for this class of enzymes, with PDB accession codes 1GQ6, 1GQ7, 1WOG, 1WOH, and 1WOI.

== Inhibitors ==
- Piperazine-1-carboxamidine
