= Proclavaminate amidinohydrolase =

Class of enzymes

Identifiers
- EC no.: 3.5.3.22

Databases
- BRENDA: enzyme data
- ExPASy: NiceZyme view
- KEGG: enzyme entry
- MetaCyc: metabolic pathway
- Rhea: reactions
- PDB structures: RCSB PDB PDBe PDBsum
Search
- PMC: articles
- PubMed: articles
- NCBI: proteins

Proclavaminate amidinohydrolase (EC 3.5.3.22) is an enzyme characterised from Streptomyces clavuligerus that catalyzes the hydrolysis of amidinoproclavaminic acid to proclavaminic acid and ammonia:

amidinoproclavaminic acid
H_{2}O
proclavaminic acid
+
urea

The reaction is part of the biosynthesis of the beta-lactamase inhibitor, clavulanic acid.

Clavulanic acid

This enzyme is a hydrolase, one acting on carbon-nitrogen bonds other than peptide bonds, specifically in linear amidines. The systematic name of this enzyme class is amidinoproclavaminate amidinohydrolase. Other names in common use include PAH, and proclavaminate amidino hydrolase.
