= Formimidoylglutamase =

Class of enzymes

Identifiers
- EC no.: 3.5.3.8
- CAS no.: 9054-92-6

Databases
- BRENDA: enzyme data
- ExPASy: NiceZyme view
- KEGG: enzyme entry
- MetaCyc: metabolic pathway
- Rhea: reactions
- PDB structures: RCSB PDB PDBe PDBsum
- Gene Ontology: AmiGO / QuickGO
Search
- PMC: articles
- PubMed: articles
- NCBI: proteins

Formimidoylglutamase (EC 3.5.3.8) is an enzyme characterised from bacteria that catalyzes the hydrolysis of formiminoglutamic acid to glutamic acid and formamide:

formiminoglutamic acid
H_{2}O
glutamic acid
+
formamide

The reaction is a step in the breakdown pathway of the amino acid, histidine.

This enzyme is a hydrolase, one acting on carbon-nitrogen bonds other than peptide bonds, specifically in linear amidines. The systematic name of this enzyme class is N-formimidoyl-L-glutamate formimidoylhydrolase. Other names in use include formiminoglutamase, N-formiminoglutamate hydrolase, and N-formimino-L-glutamate formiminohydrolase.

== Structural studies ==
As of late 2007, two structures have been solved for this class of enzymes, with PDB accession codes PDB: 1XFK and PDB: 2A0M.
