= Halomonas elongata =

Scientific classification
- Domain: Bacteria
- Kingdom: Pseudomonadati
- Phylum: Pseudomonadota
- Class: Gammaproteobacteria
- Order: Oceanospirillales
- Family: Halomonadaceae
- Genus: Halomonas
- Species: H. elongata

Binomial name
- Halomonas elongata Vreeland et al. 1980

Species of bacterium

Halomonas elongata is considered the type species of the genus Halomonas. It is a chemoorganotrophic, halophilic bacterium first isolated from a solar salt facility located in Bonaire, Netherlands Antilles.

== Biology and biochemistry ==
=== Morphology ===
Halomonas elongata cells are gram-negative rods which are motile by either polar or peritrichous flagella. On a solid medium, H. elongata produce glistening, opaque white colonies that are about 2 mm in diameter.

=== Physiology ===
Halomonas elongata are able to reduce NO_{3} to NO_{2} and are able to grow anaerobically in the presence of NO_{3}. Cells of H. elongata are capable of utilizing malonate, fermenting glucose, and oxidizing glycerol, sucrose, mannose and cellobiose. Most strains of H. elongata can also oxidize lactose and gluconate. All strains are susceptible to HgCl_{2} and chloromycetin but have only a slight susceptibility to other antibiotics like penicillin, streptomycin, tetracycline, ampicillin, vibriostat O/129, novobiocin, neomycin, bacitracin and nalidixic acid.

Halomonas elongata grows in a pH range of 5 to 9 and a temperature range of 4-45 °C. The optimum temperature being 30 °C. These organisms are also able to grow over a wide range of salt concentrations. All nine isolates first found at the Bonaire, Netherlands Antilles solar salt facility were capable of surviving in salt concentrations from 3.5 to 20%.

== Genomics ==
Halomonas elongata strains 1H9 and 1H11 have G+C contents of 60.5 %. H. elongata has a total genome size of 4.06 Mb.
