= Agmatine =

- Skeletal formula of agmatine

Names
- IUPAC name 1-(4-Aminobutyl)guanidine

Identifiers
CAS Number	306-60-5
3D model (JSmol)	Interactive image
ChEBI	CHEBI:17431
ChEMBL	ChEMBL58343
ChemSpider	194
ECHA InfoCard	100.005.626
EC Number	206-187-7
KEGG	C00179
MeSH	Agmatine
PubChem CID	199
UNII	70J407ZL5Q
CompTox Dashboard (EPA)	DTXSID0040961
- InChI: InChI=1S/C5H14N4/c6-3-1-2-4-9-5(7)8/h1-4,6H2,(H4,7,8,9) Key: QYPPJABKJHAVHS-UHFFFAOYSA-N
- SMILES: NCCCCNC(N)=N

Properties
Chemical formula	C_{5}H_{14}N_{4}
Molar mass	130.195 g·mol^{−1}
Density	1.2 g/ml
Melting point	102 °C (216 °F; 375 K)
Boiling point	281 °C (538 °F; 554 K)
Solubility in water	high
log P	−1.423
Basicity (pK_{b})	0.52

Hazards
Flash point	95.8 °C (204.4 °F; 368.9 K)
- Except where otherwise noted, data are given for materials in their standard state (at 25 °C [77 °F], 100 kPa). verify (what is ?) Infobox references

Agmatine, also known as 4-aminobutyl-guanidine, was discovered in 1910 by Albrecht Kossel. It is a chemical substance which is naturally created from the amino acid arginine. Agmatine has been shown to exert modulatory action at multiple molecular targets, notably: neurotransmitter systems, ion channels, nitric oxide (NO) synthesis, and polyamine metabolism and this provides bases for further research into potential pharmacological applications.

== History ==
The term agmatine stems from A- (for amino-) + g- (from guanidine) + -ma- (from ptomaine) + -in (German)/-ine (English) suffix with insertion of -t- apparently for euphony. A year after its discovery, it was found that agmatine could increase blood flow in rabbits; however, the physiological relevance of these findings were questioned given the high concentrations (high μM range) required. In the 1920s, researchers in the diabetes clinic of Oskar Minkowski showed that agmatine can exert mild hypoglycemic effects. In 1994, endogenous agmatine synthesis in mammals was discovered.

== Metabolic pathways ==
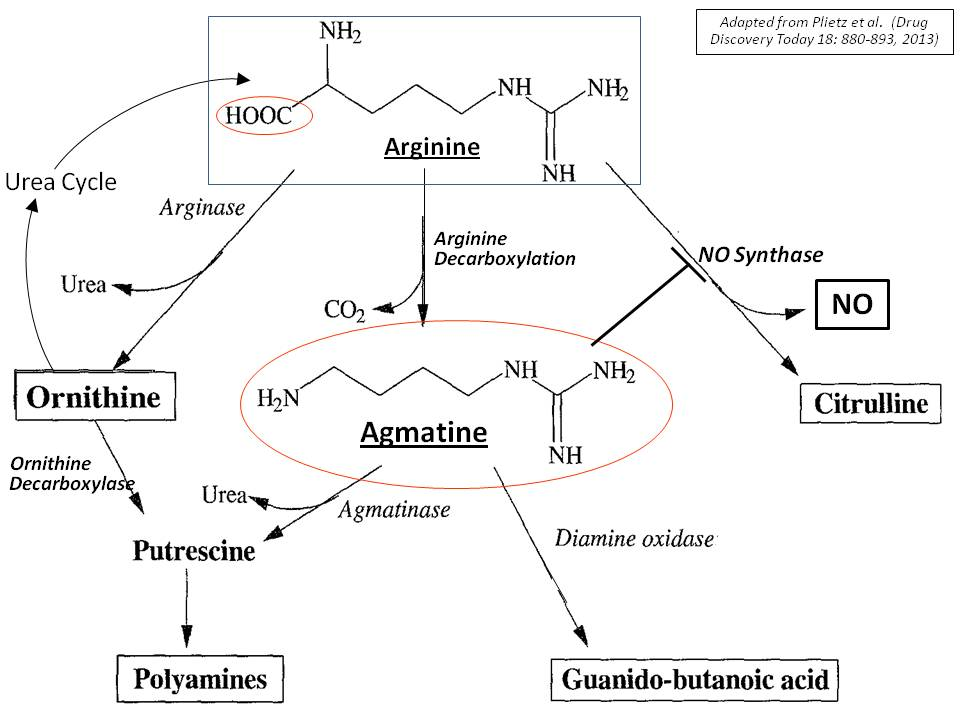
Agmatine Metabolic Pathways

Agmatine is a cationic amine formed by decarboxylation of L-arginine by the mitochondrial enzyme arginine decarboxylase (ADC). Agmatine degradation occurs mainly by hydrolysis, catalyzed by agmatinase into urea and putrescine, the diamine precursor of polyamine biosynthesis. An alternative pathway, mainly in peripheral tissues, is by diamine oxidase-catalyzed oxidation into agmatine-aldehyde, which is in turn converted by aldehyde dehydrogenase into guanidinobutyrate and secreted by the kidneys.

== Mechanisms of action ==
Agmatine was found to exert modulatory actions directly and indirectly at multiple key molecular targets underlying cellular control mechanisms of cardinal importance in health and disease. The following outline indicates the categories of control mechanisms, and identifies their molecular targets:

- Neurotransmitter receptors and receptor ionophores. Nicotinic, imidazoline I1 and I2, α2-adrenergic, glutamate NMDAr, and serotonin 5-HT2A and 5HT-3 receptors.
- Ion channels. Including: ATP-sensitive K+ channels, voltage-gated Ca^{2+} channels, and acid-sensing ion channels (ASICs).
- Membrane transporters. Agmatine specific-selective uptake sites, organic cation transporters (mostly OCT2 subtype), extraneuronal monoamine transporters (ENT), polyamine transporters, and mitochondrial agmatine specific-selective transport system.
- Nitric oxide (NO) synthesis modulation. Both differential inhibition and activation of NO synthase (NOS) isoforms is reported.
- Polyamine metabolism. Agmatine is a precursor for polyamine synthesis, competitive inhibitor of polyamine transport, inducer of spermidine/spermine acetyltransferase (SSAT), and inducer of antizyme.
- Protein ADP-ribosylation. Inhibition of protein arginine ADP-ribosylation.
- Matrix metalloproteases (MMPs). Indirect down-regulation of the enzymes MMP 2 and 9.
- Advanced glycation end product (AGE) formation. Direct blockade of AGEs formation.
- NADPH oxidase. Activation of the enzyme leading to H_{2}O_{2} production.

== Food consumption ==
Agmatine sulfate injection can increase food intake with carbohydrate preference in satiated, but not hungry, rats and this effect may be mediated by neuropeptide Y. However, supplementation in rat drinking water results in slight reductions in water intake, body weight, and blood pressure. In addition, force feeding with agmatine leads to a reduction in body weight gain during rat development. It is also found that many fermented foods contain agmatine.

== Pharmacokinetics ==
Agmatine is present in small amounts in plant-, animal-, and fish-derived foodstuff, and gut microbial production is an added source for agmatine. Oral agmatine is absorbed from the gastrointestinal tract and readily distributed throughout the body. Rapid elimination from non-brain organs of ingested (un-metabolized) agmatine by the kidneys has indicated a blood half life of about 2 hours.

== Research ==
A number of potential medical uses for agmatine have been suggested.

Agmatine is also used as a prototrophy selection marker in Microbiology for the study of Sulfolobus and Thermococcus genus.

=== Cardiovascular ===
Agmatine produces mild reductions in heart rate and blood pressure, apparently by activating both central and peripheral control systems via modulation of several of its molecular targets including: imidazoline receptors subtypes, norepinephrine release and NO production.

=== Glucose regulation ===
Agmatine hypoglycemic effects are the result of simultaneous modulation of several molecular mechanisms involved in blood glucose regulation.

=== Kidney functions ===
Agmatine has been shown to enhance glomerular filtration rate (GFR) and to exert nephroprotective effects.

=== Neurotransmission ===
Agmatine has been discussed as a putative neurotransmitter. It is synthesized in the brain, stored in synaptic vesicles, accumulated by uptake, released by membrane depolarization, and inactivated by agmatinase. Agmatine binds to α_{2}-adrenergic receptor and imidazoline receptor binding sites, and blocks NMDA receptors and other cation ligand-gated channels. However, while agmatine binds to α_{2}-adrenergic receptors, it exerts neither an agonistic nor antagonistic effect on these receptors, lacking any intrinsic activity. Apart from an absence of known agmatine-specific post-synaptic receptors, agmatine fulfills Henry Dale's criteria for a neurotransmitter and is hence considered a neuromodulator and co-transmitter. The existence of theoretical agmatinergic-mediated neuronal systems has not yet been demonstrated although the existence of such receptors is implied by its prominence in the mediation of both the central and peripheral nervous systems. Research into agmatine-specific receptors and transmission pathways continues.

Due to its ability to pass through open cationic channels, agmatine has also been used as a surrogate metric of integrated ionic flux into neural tissue upon stimulation. When neural tissue is incubated in agmatine and an external stimulus is applied, only cells with open channels will be filled with agmatine, allowing identification of which cells are sensitive to that stimuli and the degree to which they opened their cationic channels during the stimulation period.

=== Opioid liability ===
Systemic agmatine can potentiate opioid analgesia, and prevent tolerance to chronic morphine in laboratory rodents. Since then, cumulative evidence amply shows that agmatine inhibits opioid dependence and relapse in several animal species.

== See also ==
- Agmatine deiminase
- Agmatinase
