= Osmoprotectant =

Solutes

Osmoprotectants or compatible solutes are small organic molecules with neutral charge and low toxicity at high concentrations that act as osmolytes and help organisms to survive in extreme osmotic stress. Osmoprotectants can be placed in three chemical classes: betaines and associated molecules, sugars and polyols, and amino acids. These molecules accumulate in cells and balance the osmotic difference between the cell's surroundings and the cytosol. In plants, their accumulation can increase survival during stresses such as drought. In extreme cases, such as in bdelloid rotifers, tardigrades, brine shrimp, and nematodes, these molecules can allow cells to survive being completely dried out and let them enter a state of suspended animation called cryptobiosis.

Intracellular osmoprotectant concentrations are regulated in response to environmental conditions such as osmolarity and temperature via regulation of specific transcription factors and transporters. They have been shown to play a protective role by maintaining enzyme activity through freeze-thaw cycles and at higher temperatures. It is currently believed that they function by stabilizing protein structures by promoting preferential exclusion from the water layers on the surface of hydrated proteins. This favors the native conformation and displaces inorganic salts that would otherwise cause misfolding.

== Role ==
=== Plants ===
Compatible solutes have a functional role in agriculture. In high stress conditions, such as drought or high salinity, plants that naturally create or take up osmoprotectants show increased survival rates. By inducing expression or uptake of these molecules in crops in which they are naturally not present, there is an increase in the areas in which they are able to be grown. One documented reason for increased growth is regulation of toxic reactive oxygen species (ROS). In high salinity ROS production is stimulated by the photosystems of the plant. Osmoprotectants can prevent the photosystem-salt interactions, reducing ROS production. For these reasons, introduction of biosynthetic pathways which result in the creation of osmoprotectants in crops is a current area of research, but inducing expression at significant amounts is currently posing a barrier in this area of research.

=== Bacteria ===
Osmoprotectants are also important for the maintenance of top soil bacteria populations. Desiccation of top soils results in increased salinity. In these situations, the soil microbes increase the concentration of these molecule in their cytoplasm into the molar range allowing them to persist until conditions approve. In extreme cases, osmoprotectants allow cells to enter cryptobiosis. In this state the cytosol and osmoprotectants become a glass-like solid that helps stabilize proteins and cell membranes from the damaging effects of desiccation.

Osmoprotectants regulate gene expression in response to environmental osmolarity as compatible solutes even in small concentrations affect gene expression, ranging from inducing production of more compatible solutes to regulating components involved in infection, such as phospholipase C in Pseudomonas aeruginosa.

== See also ==
- Ectoine
- Osmoregulation
- Proline
