= L-Aspartic-4-semialdehyde =

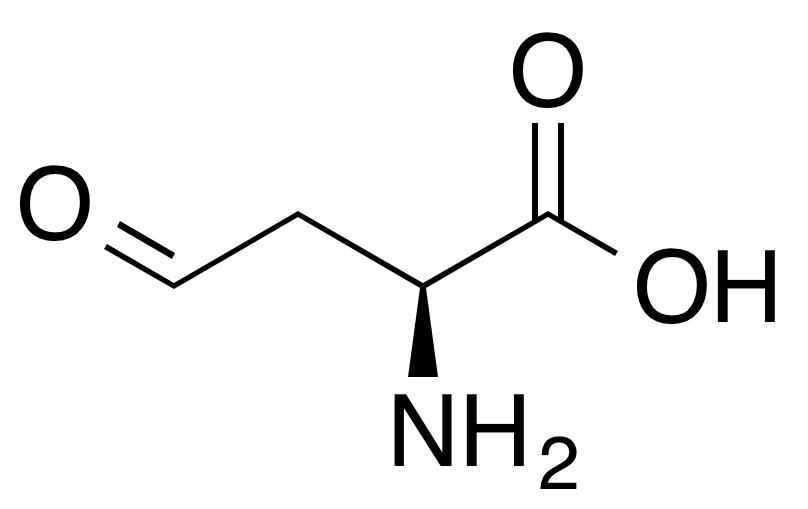

Names
- IUPAC name L-Aspart-4-al
- Systematic IUPAC name (2S)-2-Amino-4-oxobutanoic acid
- Other names L-Aspartic-β-semialdehyde

Identifiers
CAS Number	2338-03-6
3D model (JSmol)	Interactive image; Interactive image
ChEBI	CHEBI:18051
ChemSpider	388372
KEGG	C00441
PubChem CID	439235
UNII	NM79MG686B
CompTox Dashboard (EPA)	DTXSID201336656 DTXSID10934160, DTXSID201336656
- InChI: InChI=1S/C4H7NO3/c5-3(1-2-6)4(7)8/h2-3H,1,5H2,(H,7,8)/t3-/m0/s1 Key: HOSWPDPVFBCLSY-VKHMYHEASA-N
- SMILES: C(C=O)C(C(=O)O)N; C(C=O)[C@@H](C(=O)O)N

Properties
Chemical formula	C_{4}H_{7}NO_{3}
Molar mass	117.104 g·mol^{−1}
Appearance	Solid
- Except where otherwise noted, data are given for materials in their standard state (at 25 °C [77 °F], 100 kPa). Infobox references

L-Aspartic-4-semialdehyde is an α-amino acid derivative of aspartate. It is an important intermediate in the aspartate pathway, which is a metabolic pathway present in bacteria and plants. The aspartate pathway leads to the biosynthesis of a variety of amino acids from aspartate, including lysine, methionine, and threonine.

== Aspartate pathway ==
An overview of the aspartate pathway

The aspartate pathway is an amino acid metabolic pathway present in bacteria and plants that deal with converting aspartate to other amino acids through a series of reactions and intermediates. L-Aspartate-4-semialdehyde serves as one of the first intermediates in the pathway and as an important step of differentiation in the pathway.

L-Aspartate-4-semialdehyde is synthesized by the enzyme aspartate semialdehyde dehydrogenase, which catalyzes the following reversible chemical reaction:

L-4-Aspartyl phosphate + NADPH + H^{+} $\rightleftharpoons$ L-aspartate-4-semialdehyde + NADP^{+} + phosphate

Once L-aspartate-4-semialdehyde is synthesized, the molecule can then progress down a number of pathways. One possible pathway requires L-aspartate-4-semialdehyde to undergo a reaction catalyzed by the enzyme dihydrodipicolinate synthase in order to form the molecule dihydrodipicolinate. This reversible chemical reaction is shown below:

L-Aspartate-4-semialdehyde + pyruvate $\rightleftharpoons$ dihydrodipicolinate + H_{2}O

Once dihydrodipicolinate is synthesized, it can continue down the metabolic pathway leading to the synthesis of lysine. Other than the lysine biosynthetic pathway, L-aspartate-4-semialdehyde can also undergo a reversible reaction catalyzed by the enzyme homoserine dehydrogenase. This reaction, which turns L-aspartate-4-semialdehyde into homoserine is shown below:

L-Aspartate-4-semialdehyde + NAD(P)H + H^{+} $\rightleftharpoons$ homoserine + NAD(P)^{+}

Homoserine represents another branch in the aspartate pathway, as it can progress down one of two pathways to eventually become one of two amino acids: threonine or methionine. This aspartate pathway is present in plants and bacteria, allowing them to synthesize lysine, methionine, and threonine. This pathway is not present in humans or other animals, however. The lack of this pathway means that humans need to take in these amino acids through their diet, which is why they are called essential amino acids.
