= Hexanitrogen =

Names
- IUPAC name hexaaza-1,2,4,5-tetraene
- Other names Hexanitrogen

Identifiers
3D model (JSmol)	Interactive image
PubChem CID	23527683
- InChI: InChI=1S/N6/c1-3-5-6-4-2 Key: UCDGJNRDJKMFBS-UHFFFAOYSA-N
- SMILES: [N-]=[N+]=NN=[N+]=[N-]

Properties
Chemical formula	N_{6}
Molar mass	84.042 g·mol^{−1}
Appearance	colorless

Related compounds
Related compounds	Hexazine, Pentazolate, Pentazole
- Except where otherwise noted, data are given for materials in their standard state (at 25 °C [77 °F], 100 kPa). Infobox references

Hexanitrogen (diazide, hexaaza-1,2,4,5-tetraene) is an allotrope of nitrogen with the formula N_{6}. The six nitrogen atoms are all covalently bonded in a single molecule: two azide units linked to each other. Its stability and structure were theorized in 2016 and its synthesis was reported in 2025. It is stable at cryogenic temperatures. The higher symmetry analogue, the benzene-like cyclic hexazine, has remained only theoretically hypothesized.

Its synthesis has been regarded as highly significant, as higher allotropes of nitrogen have potential application as propellants, explosives or energy storage.

== Synthesis ==
It is synthesized by the reaction of silver azide (AgN_{3}) with chlorine or bromine gas under reduced pressure at room temperature via chlorine azide or bromine azide as the intermediate. The product is collected by matrix isolation in solid argon (10 K) or by condensation on a liquid nitrogen cooled surface (77 K).

== Structure ==
All six atoms form a single chain, resembling two azide (N_{3}) units linked together.

Bond lengths and angles in hexanitrogen

Computational analysis predicts that the bond lengths in the molecule vary significantly, indicating a complex electronic distribution, and a trans geometry in the central part of the structure. The terminal double bonds (N1=N2 and N5=N6) are about 1.138 Å. The adjacent double bonds (N2=N3 and N4=N5) are slightly longer, about 1.251 Å, and the central single bond (N3–N4) is the longest, about 1.460 Å. Each azide-like unit is approximately linear, with bond angles of about 172.5° at N2 and N5, and distinctly bent geometry of about 107° at N3 and N4.

== See also ==
- Dinitrogen
- Trinitrogen
- Tetranitrogen
- Hexazine
- Octaazacubane
- Black nitrogen
- Other allotropes of nitrogen
