= Allotropes of nitrogen =

Chemicals containing only nitrogen

The element nitrogen exists mainly as a diatomic molecule, N_{2}, but other allotropes exist or have been explored theoretically. Beyond dinitrogen (N_{2}), chemists have long sought to synthesize and stabilize other neutral nitrogen allotropes, which are typically much less stable and often exist only fleetingly or under extreme conditions. These chemicals may have potential applications as materials with a very high energy density that could be used as powerful propellants or explosives.

== N_{1} ==
Atomic nitrogen, also known as active nitrogen, is highly reactive, being a triradical with three unpaired electrons. Free nitrogen atoms easily react with most elements to form nitrides, and even when two free nitrogen atoms collide to produce an excited N_{2} molecule, they may release so much energy on collision with even such stable molecules as carbon dioxide and water to cause homolytic fission into radicals such as CO and O or OH and H. Atomic nitrogen is prepared by passing an electric discharge through nitrogen gas at 0.1–2 mmHg, which produces atomic nitrogen along with a peach-yellow emission that fades slowly as an afterglow for several minutes even after the discharge terminates.

== N_{2} ==
Elemental nitrogen usually occurs as molecular N_{2}, dinitrogen. This molecule is a colourless, odourless, and tasteless diamagnetic gas at standard conditions: it melts at −210 °C and boils at −196 °C. Dinitrogen is mostly unreactive at room temperature, but it will nevertheless react with lithium metal and some transition metal complexes. This is due to its bonding, which is unique among the diatomic elements at standard conditions in that it has an N≡N triple bond. Triple bonds have short bond lengths (in this case, 109.76 pm) and high dissociation energies (in this case, 945.41 kJ/mol), and are thus very strong, explaining dinitrogen's low level of chemical reactivity.

At atmospheric pressure, molecular nitrogen condenses (liquefies) at 77 K (−195.79 °C) and freezes at 63 K (−210.01 °C) into the beta hexagonal close-packed crystal allotropic form. Below 35.4 K (−237.6 °C) nitrogen assumes the cubic crystal allotropic form (called the alpha phase). Liquid nitrogen, a colourless fluid resembling water in appearance, but with 80.8% of the density (the density of liquid nitrogen at its boiling point is 0.808 g/mL), is a common cryogen. Solid nitrogen has many crystalline modifications. It forms a significant dynamic surface coverage on Pluto and outer moons of the Solar System such as Triton. Even at the low temperatures of solid nitrogen it is fairly volatile and can sublime to form an atmosphere, or condense back into nitrogen frost. It is very weak and flows in the form of glaciers, and on Triton geysers of nitrogen gas come from the polar ice cap region.

== N_{3} ==
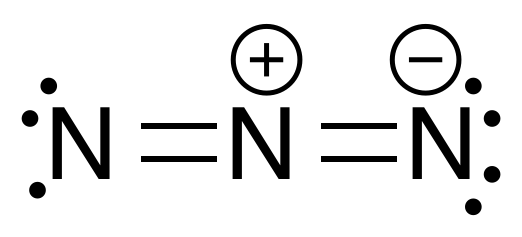
Linear

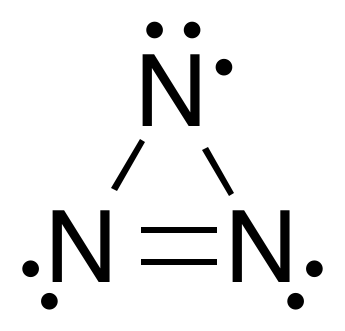
Cyclic

Isomers of trinitrogen

Trinitrogen (N_{3}, the azide radical) is known, with two different constitutional isomeric forms: a linear isomer with double bonds and charge transfer, and a cyclic isomer. Both forms are highly unstable, though the linear form is the more stable of the two.

== N_{4} ==
Tetranitrogen (N_{4}) is known, but is either extremely unstable or exists only as short-lived intermediate.

== N_{5} ==
While neutral N_{5} structures have not been observed, both pentazenium N^{+}_{5} and cyclo–N^{+}_{5} pentazolate are known.

== N_{6} ==
Hexanitrogen (N_{6}), a neutral, linear chain of six nitrogen atoms with alternating double and single bonds, which is stable only at cryogenic temperatures and represents the first stable neutral nitrogen allotrope beyond dinitrogen.

Cyclic hexazine (N_{6}), a hypothetical ring-like molecule analogous to benzene, has not been synthesized as a neutral species, though negatively charged variants have been produced under extreme conditions; its instability is attributed to the repulsion of lone pairs on nitrogen atoms.

== N_{8} ==
Among the several different phases of solid nitrogen, an N_{8} molecular allotrope has been detected.

Octaazacubane (N_{8}), a hypothetical cubane-type cluster of eight nitrogen atoms, is predicted to be highly energetic and potentially useful as an explosive or rocket fuel, though it remains unsynthesized to date.

== N_{10} ==
A number of possible isomers for N_{10} have been studied theoretically, though none has been successfully synthesised as of 2025. The most stable predicted structure is a dimeric bispentazole. Triazidamine, N(N_{3})_{3}, has been studied theoretically for purposes of structure analysis in comparison with other ammonia analogs having nitrogen substituents and in the context of energy density of compounds with high nitrogen content.

== N_{20} ==
Possible isomers of N_{20} have also been studied theoretically, though again none has been successfully synthesised as yet. The highly symmetrical perazadodecahedrane has been suggested as a possible stable structure for N_{20}, though calculations suggest it may not actually be the most stable form, because the planar pentagonal faces suffer from eclipsing interactions.

== N_{n} ==
Among the several different phases of solid nitrogen, several different three-dimensional lattices and amorphous forms have been detected.

Under extremely high pressures (1.1 million atm) and high temperatures (2000 K), as produced in a diamond anvil cell, nitrogen polymerises into the single-bonded cubic gauche crystal structure. This structure is similar to that of diamond, and both have extremely strong covalent bonds, resulting in its nickname "nitrogen diamond".
