= C4H4N2 =

The molecular formula C_{4}H_{4}N_{2} may refer to:

- Diazines
  - Pyrazine
  - Pyridazine
  - Pyrimidine
- Succinonitrile, or butanedinitrile
