= Azinamine =

An azinamine is a theoretical chemical compound in which azide functional groups (−N_{3}) are attached to nitrogen. The simple ones based on ammonia are unknown, but would be H_{2}N−N_{3} (azidoamine), HN(N_{3})_{2} (diazidoamine) and N(N_{3})_{3} (triazidoamine). The last would be a high-energy allotrope of nitrogen (N_{10}).
