= Magnetic inequivalence =

In the context of nuclear magnetic resonance (NMR), the term magnetic inequivalence refers to the distinction between magnetically active nuclear spins by their NMR signals, owing to a difference in either chemical shift (magnetic inequivalence by the chemical shift criterion) or spin–spin coupling (J-coupling) (magnetic inequivalence by the coupling criterion). Since chemically inequivalent spins (i.e. nuclei not related by symmetry) are expected to also be magnetically distinct (barring accidental overlap of signals), and since an observed difference in chemical shift makes their inequivalence clear, the term magnetic inequivalence most commonly refers solely to the latter type, i.e. to situations of chemically equivalent spins differing in their coupling relationships.

This situation can arise in a number of ways and can give rise to complexities in the corresponding NMR signals (beyond what a first-order analysis would handle) that range from the unnoticeable to the dramatic.

== Occurrence ==
Two (or more) chemically equivalent (symmetry-related) spins will have the same chemical shift, but those that have a different coupling relationship to the same coupling partner are magnetically inequivalent by the coupling criterion. This occurs in molecules bearing two (or more) chemically distinct groups of symmetry-related nuclei, with just one element of symmetry relating them. Most commonly, two chemically inequivalent pairs of hydrogen nuclei (protons) are involved, although other magnetically active nuclei will also show this phenomenon, and the spin system is often labelled an AA′BB′ system. Additional coupling partners may also be present, but it is the two A/A′ and B/B′ signals (at different chemical shifts) that are said to show magnetic inequivalence between the symmetry-related A and A′ (or B and B′) pairs at the same chemical shift. If the chemical shift difference (ν_{A}−ν_{B}) is large compared to the largest coupling constant, the spin system may be designated AA′XX′.

=== Paired H-C-C-H fragments ===
Magnetic inequivalence may occur with two symmetry-related H_{A}-C-C-H_{B} fragments (where the different subscripts indicate chemical inequivalence) that may or may not be contiguous. In order to distinguish the resulting coupling relationships, the symmetry-related pair would be labelled H_{A′}-C-C-H_{B′}.

==== ortho-Disubstituted benzenes ====
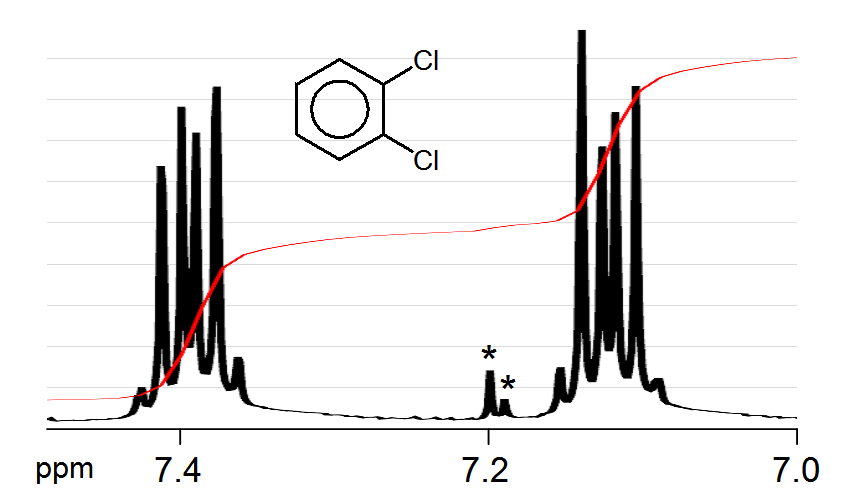
aromatic region (CDCl_{3}, 300 MHz); starred peaks are from impurities

H-3 and H-6 in any 1,2-homodisubstituted benzene are related by a mirror plane of symmetry bisecting the 1,2 and 4,5 C-C bonds. They are therefore chemically equivalent (and magnetically equivalent by the chemical shift criterion) but, because they have different spatial and connectivity relations to H-4 (with 3-bond vs. 4-bond couplings of different strengths), they are magnetically inequivalent by the coupling criterion. The same is true with respect to their coupling relationships with H-5. Similarly, H-4 and H-5 are chemically equivalent but magnetically inequivalent owing to their different coupling relationships with H-3 (or H-6).

A classic example showing highly complex splitting is that of 1,2-dichlorobenzene. The two signals are nearly mirror-symmetrical. In 1,2-diaminobenzene (ortho-phenylenediamine), the two signals have nearly the same chemical shift, so that the resultant signals form a complex multiplet.

==== para-Disubstituted benzenes ====
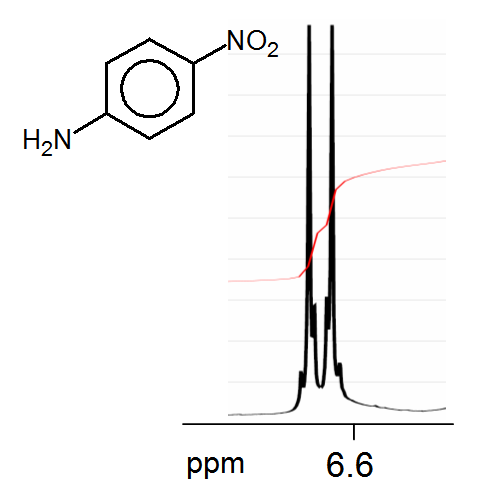
H-2/6 signal close-up (CDCl_{3}, 300 MHz); the H-3/5 signal is identical

H-2 and H-6 in any 1,4-heterodisubstituted benzene are related by a mirror plane of symmetry passing through C-1 and C-4. They are therefore chemically equivalent (and magnetically equivalent by the chemical shift criterion) but, because they have different spatial and connectivity relations to H-3 (with 3-bond vs. 5-bond coupling constants of different strengths), they are magnetically inequivalent by the coupling criterion. The same is true with respect to their coupling relationships with H-5. Similarly, H-3 and H-5 are chemically equivalent but magnetically inequivalent owing to their different coupling relationships with H-2 (or H-6).

An example is provided by 4-nitroaniline. Although each signal retains the gross doublet shape predicted by first-order analysis, a close-up view of each reveals additional peaks.

==== Other aromatics ====
Any 4-substituted pyridine, pyridine itself, 1-substituted pyrazinium ion, diazine, 1-substituted or unsubstituted pyrrole and related aromatic heterocyclics (phospholes, furan, thiophene, etc.) as well as unsubstituted or 1-substituted cyclopentadienes and 1-substituted cyclopentadienides all have the same symmetry framework as para-disubstituted or ortho-homodisubstituted benzenes, and will present chemically equivalent but magnetically inequivalent pairs of protons. In heterocycles and in five-membered rings in general, however, ^{3}J values can be significantly smaller than in benzenes and the manifestation of magnetic inequivalence may be subtle.

The rarer seven-membered and higher ring systems may also show the same symmetry property, as can linked and fused aromatic ring systems such as biphenyls, naphthalenes and isoindoles. Similarly, 1-H benzimidazoles have the appropriate symmetry if N^{1}-deprotonated or N^{3}-protonated, or as a result of rapid tautomerization of the neutral form (for instance, in DMSO-d_{6}) where the signals greatly resemble those of 1,2-dichlorobenzene.

==== Non-aromatic systems ====
The occurrence of symmetry-related pairs of H_{A}-C-C-H_{B} fragments is not limited to aromatic systems. For instance, magnetic inequivalence is found in 1,4-homodisubstituted butadienes. It might be expected in a molecule such as a symmetrical 2,3,4,5-tetrasubstituted pyrrolidine, but less rigid and less flat sp^{3} frameworks tend to show very weak long-range couplings (through 4 or more bonds) so as to not manifest much sign of magnetic inequivalence. Reich gives several additional examples of magnetic inequivalence in non-aromatic H-C-C-H pairs.

=== H_{2}C-CH_{2} fragments ===
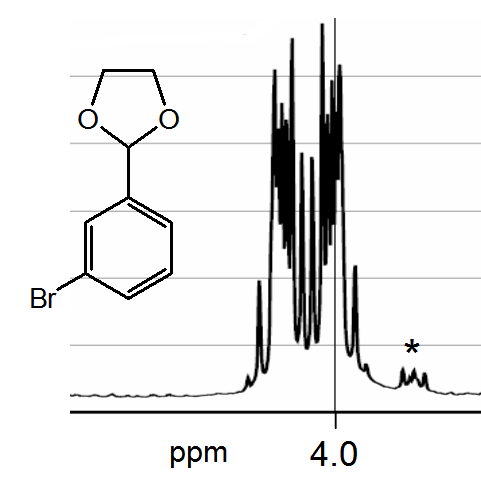
CH_{2} region (CDCl_{3}, 300 MHz); starred peaks are from impurities

Magnetic inequivalence may occur with H_{2}C-CH_{2} fragments that are subdivided into two groups of two in either geminal relationships via a mirror plane along the C-C bond, i.e. H_{A}H_{A′}C-CH_{B}H_{B′}, or in vicinal relationships via a mirror plane bisecting the C-C bond, i.e. in H_{A}H_{B}C-CH_{A′}H_{B′}, or via a rotational axis of symmetry (a C_{2}-axis), i.e. H_{A}H_{B}C-CH_{B′}H_{A′}. The coupling constants then differ because of geometry (cis vs. trans) or connectivity (2-bond vs. 3-bond) and the level of complexity will depend on the differences. Conformational dynamics may reduce or even obliterate the difference between cis and trans couplings, if fast compared to the NMR timescale. There may also be additional couplings to other nuclei.

The ethylene fragment in 2-substituted dioxolanes can thus show a high level of complexity if the substituent is large. Symmetrical norbornanes and similarly rigid compounds (e.g. 7-oxabicyclo[2.2.1]heptane) also show complex signals for the ethylene fragments, made more complicated by additional splitting by the bridgehead protons. Reich gives several additional examples of magnetic inequivalence in acyclic and cyclic systems containing H_{2}C-CH_{2} fragments.

=== With other nuclei ===
Any pair of symmetry-related X-C-C-Y fragments (where X and Y are different magnetically active nuclei) as well as XYC-CXY (cis or trans) and X_{2}C-CY_{2} fragments may show magnetic inequivalence when the heteronuclear coupling constants (^{2}J_{XY} or ^{3}J_{XY}) are non-negligible. In principle, the magnetically active nuclei may also be disposed on non-carbon atoms.

A classic example is the ^{1}H-NMR spectrum of 1,1-difluoroethylene. The single ^{1}H-NMR signal is made complex by the ^{2}J_{H-H} and two different ^{3}J_{H-F} splittings. The ^{19}F-NMR spectrum will look identical. The other two difluoroethylene isomers give similarly complex spectra.

== Appearance ==
Whereas a four-spin AA′BB′ (or AA′XX′) system may have the requisite symmetry and coupling properties, its signals may show more or less complexity and, as with other coupling phenomena, the appearance of a signal from magnetically inequivalent nuclei will also depend on the instrumental field strength. A large number of such systems show less complexity, with fewer lines than is possible, particularly when the instrumental resolution is low, whence nearby peaks appear to coalesce, when J_{AB} ≈ J_{A′B′}, when J_{AB} ≈ −J_{AB′}, when J_{AA′} ≈ J_{BB′} or when J_{BB′} ≈ 0. The apparent complexity is also diminished in AA′XX′ systems when ν_{A}−ν_{X} >> J_{AX}. This kind of simplication is enhanced as the instrumental magnetic field is increased, since the field-independent differences between coupling constants or between a coupling constant and zero appear proportionately smaller on the δ (ppm) scale, and since the field-dependent quantity (ν_{A}−ν_{X})/J_{AX} is magnified.

In molecules of uncertain or otherwise unproven structure, the definitive appearance of complexity in a pair of signals, beyond what can be explained by first-order analysis of HC-CH pairs or H_{2}C-CH_{2} fragments, can be taken to signify the presence of magnetic inequivalence and, therefore, of an element of symmetry aggregating them. Thus, the appearance of such complexity in the aromatic region of the ^{1}H-NMR spectrum of the bis-(acetylacetonato)ruthenium complex of o-benzoquinonediimine served to prove its C_{2}-symmetrical nature.

== Analysis ==
Manual analysis of an AA′BB′ or AA′XX′ system is possible, if a sufficient number of peaks are detected. The A/A′ and B/B′ chemical shifts and the several coupling constants between each spin can be accurately obtained by quantum-mechanical simulation of the spin transition probabilities, given a set of guessed chemical shift and coupling constant values, and subsequent refinement of those values by iterative spectral fitting. Several software packages are available for this purpose, a sampling of which is (in no particular order):

- SPINEVOLUTION. Website: http://spinevolution.org
- NMR Simulator (free online use). Website: https://www.nmrdb.org/simulator
- WINDNMR-Pro (shareware download). Website: http://www.chem.wisc.edu/areas/reich/plt/windnmr.htm
- SpinWorks (freeware download). Websites: http://nmrwiki.org/wiki/index.php?title=SpinWorks and http://home.cc.umanitoba.ca/~wolowiec/spinworks/index.html
- PERCH NMR Software, Website: https://www.perchsolutions.com
