= Tetrazine =

Class of chemical compounds

Structure of 1,2,3,4-tetrazine

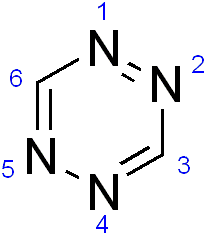
Structure of 1,2,4,5-tetrazine

Tetrazine is a compound that consists of a six-membered aromatic ring containing four nitrogen atoms with the molecular formula C_{2}H_{2}N_{4}. The name tetrazine is used in the nomenclature of derivatives of this compound. Three core-ring isomers exist: 1,2,3,4-tetrazines, 1,2,3,5-tetrazines, and 1,2,4,5-tetrazines, also known as v-tetrazines, as-tetrazines and s-tetrazines respectively.

== 1,2,3,4-Tetrazines ==
1,2,3,4-Tetrazines are often isolated fused to an aromatic ring system and are stabilized as the dioxide derivatives.

== 1,2,4,5-Tetrazines ==
1,2,4,5-Tetrazines have been well studied and myriad 3,6-disubstituted 1,2,4,5-tetrazines are known. These materials are of use in the area of energetic chemistry.

Heavily substituted tetrazines form the verdazyls, a family of stable radicals.

Protected tetrazines are strong acetylene acceptors in Diels-Alder equilibria. For example, dipyridinyl 1,2,4,5-tetrazine abstracts acetylene from norbornadiene to cyclopentadiene and a pyridazine: 1,2,4,5-tetrazines are widely used in bioorthogonal chemistry as part of inverse electron demand diels alder (IEDDA) reactions due to their biocompaibility and the degree of orthogonality they provide to other commonly used reactions such as click chemistry (CuAAC or SPAAC).

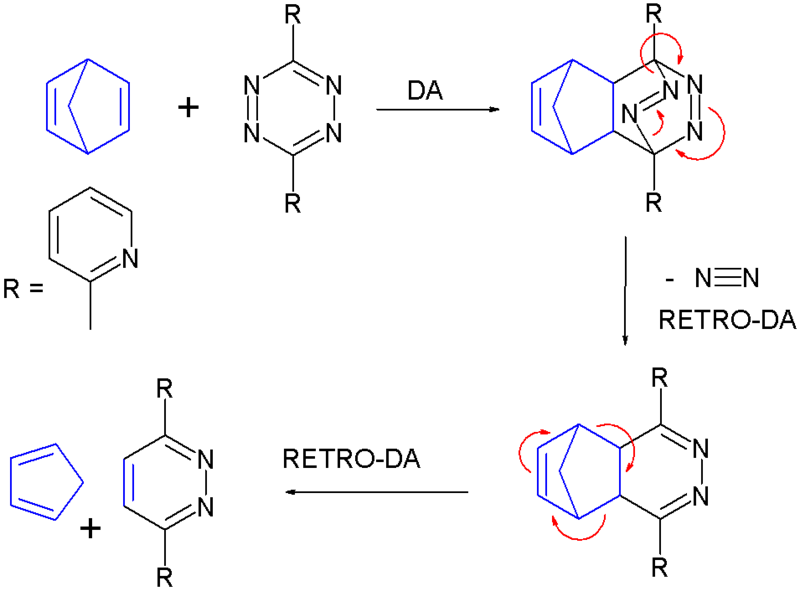

With norbornadiene fused to an arene the reaction stops at an intermediary stage.

== 1,2,3,5-Tetrazines ==
1,2,3,5-Tetrazines are comparatively less explored than the other two isomers, but some general synthetic routes are known.

== See also ==
- 6-membered rings with one nitrogen atom: pyridine
- 6-membered rings with two nitrogen atoms: diazines
- 6-membered rings with three nitrogen atoms: triazines
- 6-membered rings with five nitrogen atoms: pentazine
- 6-membered rings with six nitrogen atoms: hexazine
