= Leukotriene-E4 20-monooxygenase =

Class of enzymes

Identifiers
- EC no.: 1.14.13.34
- CAS no.: 111940-51-3

Databases
- IntEnz: IntEnz view
- BRENDA: BRENDA entry
- ExPASy: NiceZyme view
- KEGG: KEGG entry
- MetaCyc: metabolic pathway
- PRIAM: profile
- PDB structures: RCSB PDB PDBe PDBsum
- Gene Ontology: AmiGO / QuickGO
Search
- PMC: articles
- PubMed: articles
- NCBI: proteins

Leukotriene-E4 20-monooxygenase (EC 1.14.13.34) is an enzyme that catalyzes the chemical reaction

leukotriene E4
+ NADPH + H^{+}
O_{2}
H_{2}O
20-hydroxy-leukotriene E4
+ NADP^{+}

The four substrates of this enzyme are leukotriene E4, reduced nicotinamide adenine dinucleotide phosphate (NADPH), oxygen and a proton. Its products are 20-hydroxy-leukotriene E4, oxidised NADP^{+}, and water.

This enzyme belongs to the family of oxidoreductases, specifically those acting on paired donors, with molecular oxygen as oxidant and incorporation of one of atoms. The systematic name of this enzyme class is (7E,9E,11Z,14Z)-(5S,6R)-6-(cystein-S-yl)-5-hydroxyicosa-7,9,11,14-te traenoate,NADPH:oxygen oxidoreductase (20-hydroxylating). It is also called leukotriene-E4 omega-hydroxylaseand participates in arachidonic acid metabolism.
