= Hexazine =

- Kekulé and aromatic, skeletal formulae of hexazine

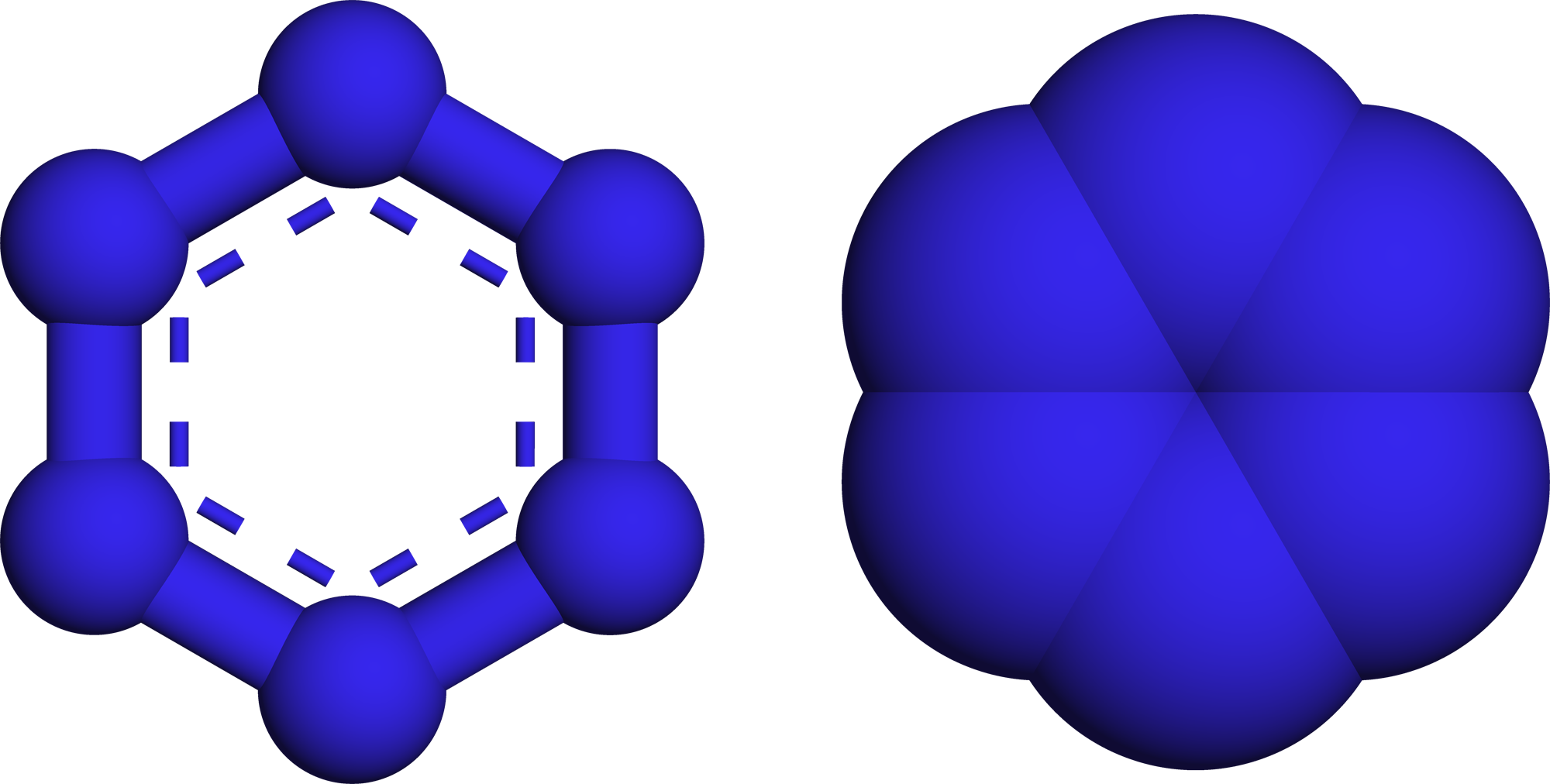
- Ball and stick, and spacefill models of hexazine

Names
- Preferred IUPAC name Hexazine (preselected name)
- Systematic IUPAC name Hexaazabenzene
- Other names Hexazabenzene; Hexaazabenzene; Azabenzene

Identifiers
CAS Number	7616-35-5
3D model (JSmol)	Interactive image; Interactive image
ChEBI	CHEBI:36869
ChemSpider	10140271
Gmelin Reference	1819
PubChem CID	[https://pubchem.ncbi.nlm.nih.gov/compound/correct pubchem from PubChem 11966278 pubchem from PubChem]
CompTox Dashboard (EPA)	DTXSID50474898
- InChI: InChI=1S/N6/c1-2-4-6-5-3-1 Key: YRBKSJIXFZPPGF-UHFFFAOYSA-N
- SMILES: n1nnnnn1; N1=NN=NN=N1

Properties
Chemical formula	N_{6}
Molar mass	84.042 g·mol^{−1}
- Except where otherwise noted, data are given for materials in their standard state (at 25 °C [77 °F], 100 kPa). verify (what is ?) Infobox references

Hexazine (also known as hexaazabenzene) is a hypothetical allotrope of nitrogen composed of 6 nitrogen atoms arranged in a ring-like structure analogous to that of benzene. As a neutrally charged species, hexazine would be the final member of the azabenzene (azine) series, in which all of the methine groups of the benzene molecule have been replaced with nitrogen atoms. The two last members of this series, hexazine and pentazine, have not been observed, although all other members of the azine series have (such as pyridine, pyrimidine, pyridazine, pyrazine, triazines, and tetrazines).

While a neutrally charged hexazine species has not yet been synthesized, two negatively charged variants, [N_{6}]^{2-} and [N_{6}]^{4-}, have been produced in potassium-nitrogen compounds under very high pressures (> 40 GPa) and temperatures (> 2000 K). In particular, [N_{6}]^{4-} is aromatic, respecting Hückel's rule, while [N_{6}]^{2-} is anti-aromatic. The synthesis of the structural isomer, the linear hexanitrogen, C_{2h}-N_{6}, was published in 2025.

== Stability ==
The hexazine molecule bears a structural similarity to the very stable benzene molecule. Like benzene, it has been calculated that hexazine is likely an aromatic molecule. Despite this, it has yet to be synthesized. Additionally, it has been predicted computationally that the hexazine molecule is highly unstable, possibly due to the lone pairs on the nitrogen atoms, which may repel each other electrostatically and/or cause electron-donation to sigma antibonding orbitals. A figure-8-shaped isomer is predicted to be metastable.

== See also ==
- 6-membered rings with other numbers of nitrogen atoms: pyridines, diazines, triazines, tetrazines, and (like hexazine, theoretical) pentazines
- Azide
- Pentazole (HN_{5})
- Other molecular allotropes of nitrogen: tetranitrogen (N_{4}), hexanitrogen (N_{6}), octaazacubane (N_{8})
- Other inorganic benzene analogues: borazine, hexaphosphabenzene
