= Quinine 3-monooxygenase =

Class of enzymes

Identifiers
- EC no.: 1.14.14.55

Databases
- IntEnz: IntEnz view
- BRENDA: BRENDA entry
- ExPASy: NiceZyme view
- KEGG: KEGG entry
- MetaCyc: metabolic pathway
- PRIAM: profile
- PDB structures: RCSB PDB PDBe PDBsum
- Gene Ontology: AmiGO / QuickGO
Search
- PMC: articles
- PubMed: articles
- NCBI: proteins

A Quinine 3-monooxygenase (EC 1.14.14.55) is an enzyme that catalyzes the chemical reaction

quinine
+ NADPH
O_{2} + H^{+}
H_{2}O
3-hydroxyquinine
+ NADP^{+}

In humans, the multi-function protein CYP3A4 catalyzes this reaction, along with many others. The four substrates of this enzyme are quinine, reduced nicotinamide adenine dinucleotide phosphate (NADPH), oxygen, and a proton. Its products are 3-hydroxyquinine, oxidised NADP^{+}, and water.

This enzyme is a cytochrome P450 protein containing heme. This oxidoreductase, which uses molecular oxygen as oxidant is in a group with systematic name quinine,NADPH:oxygen oxidoreductase. This enzyme is also called quinine 3-hydroxylase. It is present in human liver, where it is involved in the metabolism of quinine.

== Structural studies ==
As of late 2007, 5 structures have been solved for this class of enzymes, with PDB accession codes 1W0E, 1W0F, 1W0G, 2J0D, and 2V0M.
