= Pentazine =

Names
- Preferred IUPAC name Pentazine

Identifiers
CAS Number	290-97-1
3D model (JSmol)	Interactive image; Interactive image
ChemSpider	4953936
PubChem CID	6451471
CompTox Dashboard (EPA)	DTXSID50183195
- InChI: InChI=1S/CHN5/c1-2-4-6-5-3-1/h1H Key: ALAGDBVXZZADSN-UHFFFAOYSA-N
- SMILES: C1=NN=NN=N1; c1nnnnn1

Properties
Chemical formula	CHN_{5}
Molar mass	83.054 g·mol^{−1}
- Except where otherwise noted, data are given for materials in their standard state (at 25 °C [77 °F], 100 kPa). (what is ?) Infobox references

Pentazine is a hypothetical chemical compound that consists of a six-membered aromatic ring containing five nitrogen atoms with the molecular formula CHN_{5}. The name pentazine is used in the nomenclature of derivatives of this compound.

Pentazine is predicted to be unstable and to decompose into hydrogen cyanide (HCN) and nitrogen (N_{2}). The activation energy required is predicted to be around 20 kJ/mol.

== See also ==
- 6-membered rings with one nitrogen atom: pyridine
- 6-membered rings with two nitrogen atoms: diazines
- 6-membered rings with three nitrogen atoms: triazines
- 6-membered rings with four nitrogen atoms: tetrazines
- 6-membered rings with six nitrogen atoms: hexazine
