= High-energy-density matter =

High-energy-density matter (HEDM) is a class of energetic materials, particularly fuel, with a high ratio of potential chemical energy output to density, usually termed "thrust-to-weight ratio", hence "high energy density". The substances are extremely reactive, therefore potentially dangerous, and some consider them impractical. Researchers are looking into HEDM that can provide much more lift than the current liquid hydrogen-liquid oxygen reactions used in today's spacecraft.

Currently, most leading HEDM tend to be nitrogen based compounds with high ring strain, such as Octaazacubane and Hexanitrohexaazaisowurtzitane (also called HNIW or CL-20). These owe their high energy density to their innate oxygen content & the structural instability caused by smaller angles between molecular bonds.

== See also ==
- Energy density
- Oxygen rings
