= Tetraoxygen =

4-atom allotrope of oxygen

The tetraoxygen molecule (O_{4}), also called oxozone, is an allotrope of oxygen consisting of four oxygen atoms.

== History ==
Tetraoxygen was first predicted in 1924 by Gilbert N. Lewis, who proposed it as an explanation for the failure of liquid oxygen to obey Curie's law. Though not entirely inaccurate, computer simulations indicate that although there are no stable O_{4} molecules in liquid oxygen, O_{2} molecules do tend to associate in pairs with antiparallel spins, forming transient O_{4} units. In 1999, researchers thought that solid oxygen in its ε-phase, also known as red oxygen, (at pressures above 10 GPa) was O_{4}. However, in 2006, it was shown by X-ray crystallography that this stable phase is in fact octaoxygen (O_{8}). Nevertheless, positively charged tetraoxygen has been detected as a short-lived chemical species in mass spectrometry experiments.

== Structure ==
Theoretical calculations have predicted the existence of metastable O_{4} molecules with two different shapes: a "puckered" square like cyclobutane or S_{4}, and a "pinwheel" with three oxygen atoms surrounding a central one in a trigonal planar formation similar to boron trifluoride or sulfur trioxide. It was previously pointed out that the "pinwheel" O_{4} molecule should be the natural continuation of the isoelectronic series BO^{3−}_{3}, CO^{2−}_{3}, NO^{−}_{3}, and analogous to SO_{3}; that observation served as the basis for the mentioned theoretical calculations.

Theoretical structures of metastable O_{4}.
D_{2d} structure	D_{3h} structure

In 2001, a team at the University of Rome La Sapienza conducted a neutralization-reionization mass spectrometry experiment to investigate the structure of free O_{4} molecules. Their results did not agree with either of the two proposed molecular structures, but they did agree with a complex between two O_{2} molecules, one in the ground state and the other in a specific excited state.

A chain structure is theoretically possible, but attempts at advanced computational analysis found that it rearranged to the D_{2d} structure.

== Atmospheric occurrence ==
In atmospheric sciences, O_{4} usually refers to the collision-induced complex arising from interactions between two O_{2} molecules. Also called O_{2}-O_{2} dimers, these unstable dimers exhibit distinct collision-induced absorption (CIA) bands in the UV and visible ranges. Because molecular oxygen is well-mixed and the distribution is well known, the concentration of O_{2}-O_{2} dimers is predictable and primarily dependent on air density. Since clouds change how light passes through the atmosphere, the strength of the O_{2}-O_{2} absorption can be used to detect their presence and height. Therefore, satellite measurements of spectral radiance within the O_{2}-O_{2} absorption bands can be used to calculate cloud properties such as cloud-top pressure and cloud fraction globally. The same absorption features, including bands at 360, 477 and 577 nm, are used to derive aerosol profiles in atmospheric optical spectroscopy, where the predictable distribution of O_{2} provides useful constraint in aerosol inversion techniques and radiative transfer models.

== Potential use ==
Tetraoxygen has been speculated as an alternative to traditional liquid oxygen in rocket propulsion. Its higher density—approximately twice that of liquid oxygen—could allow for smaller oxidizer tanks, lowering overall vehicle mass and increasing payload capacity.

== See also ==
- Tetranitrogen (N_{4})
- Solid oxygen
- Liquid oxygen
