= Octaazacubane =

Allotrope of nitrogen

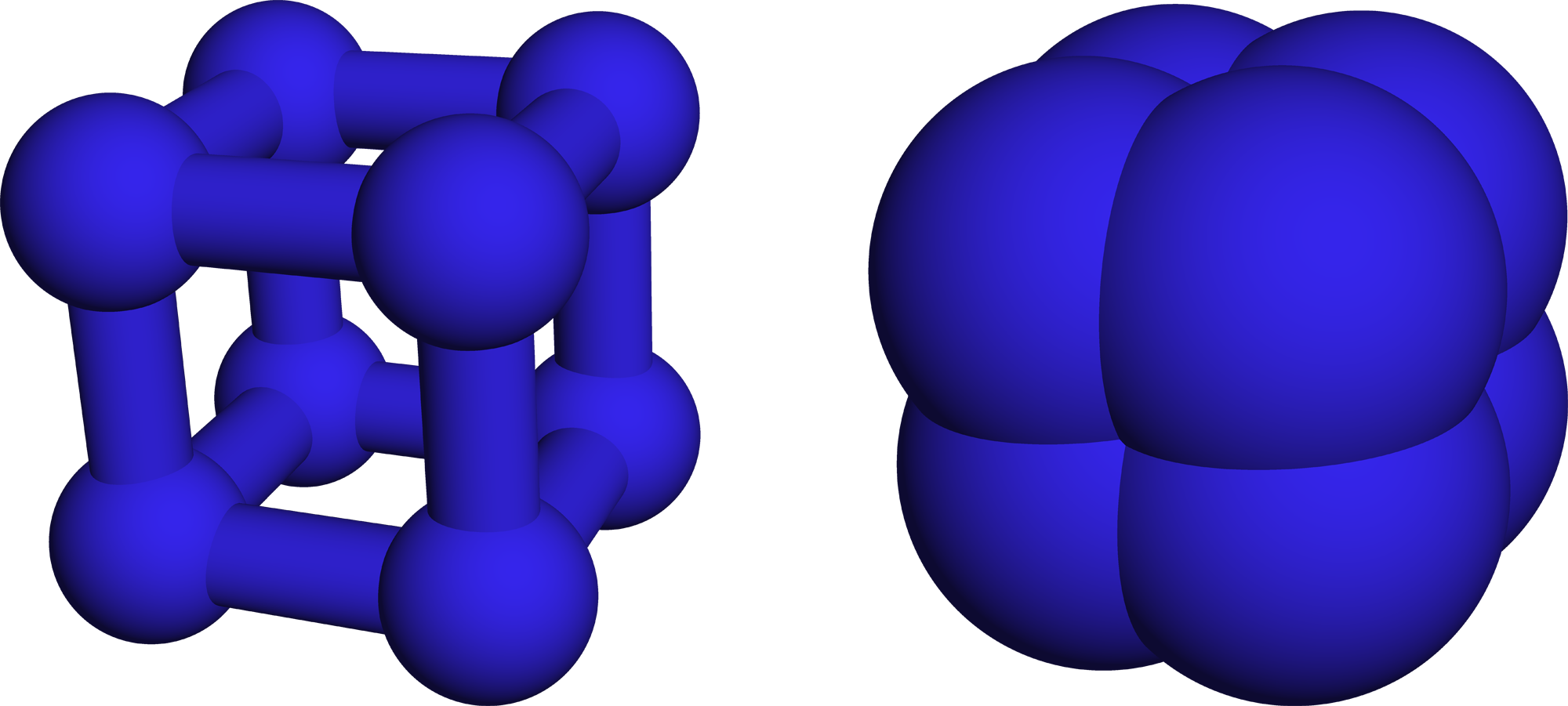

Names
- IUPAC name Octaazacubane
- Other names Octaazapentacyclo[4.2.0.0^{2,5}.0^{3,8}.0^{4,7}]octane; Cubaazane; Nitrogen octaatomic molecule

Identifiers
CAS Number	78998-15-9
3D model (JSmol)	Interactive image
ChemSpider	57566579
PubChem CID	57469154
CompTox Dashboard (EPA)	DTXSID80726751
- InChI: InChI=1S/N8/c1-2-5-3(1)7-4(1)6(2)8(5)7 Key: QKLIVIBCUWQEME-UHFFFAOYSA-N
- SMILES: N12N3N4N1N5N4N3N52

Properties
Chemical formula	N_{8}
Molar mass	112.056 g·mol^{−1}
Density	2.69 g/cm^{3} (predicted)
- Except where otherwise noted, data are given for materials in their standard state (at 25 °C [77 °F], 100 kPa). verify (what is ?) Infobox references

Octaazacubane is a hypothetical explosive allotrope of nitrogen with formula N_{8}, whose molecules have eight atoms arranged into a cube. (By comparison, nitrogen usually occurs as the diatomic molecule N_{2}.) It can be regarded as a cubane-type cluster, where all eight corners are nitrogen atoms bonded along the edges. It is predicted to be a metastable molecule, in which despite the thermodynamic instability caused by bond strain, and the high energy of the N–N single bonds, the molecule remains kinetically stable for reasons of orbital symmetry.

== Explosive and fuel ==
Octaazacubane is predicted to have an energy density (assuming decomposition into N_{2}) of 22.9 MJ/kg, which is over 5 times the standard value of TNT.

This substance has therefore been proposed (along with other exotic nitrogen allotropes) as an explosive, and as a component of high performance rocket fuel. Its velocity of detonation is predicted to be 15,000 m/s, much (48.5%) more than octanitrocubane, the fastest known nonnuclear explosive.

A prediction for cubic gauche nitrogen energy density is 33 MJ/kg, exceeding octaazacubane by 44%, though a more recent one is of 10.22 MJ/kg, making it less than half of octaazacubane.

== See also ==
- Tetranitrogen (Nitrogen allotrope with formula N_{4})
- Pentazole
- Hexazine (Nitrogen allotrope with formula N_{6})
- 1,1′-Azobis-1,2,3-triazole
- 1-Diazidocarbamoyl-5-azidotetrazole
- Octaoxygen (Oxygen allotrope with formula O_{8})
