= Triazine =

Aromatic, heterocyclic compound

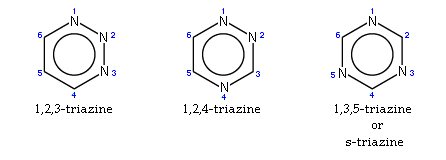
The three isomers of triazine, with ring numbering

Triazines are a class of nitrogen-containing heterocycles. The parent molecules' molecular formula is C_{3}H_{3}N_{3}. They exist in three isomeric forms, 1,3,5-triazines being common.

== Structure ==
The triazines have planar six-membered benzene-like ring but with the three carbons replaced by nitrogens. The three isomers of triazine are distinguished by the positions of their nitrogen atoms, and are referred to as 1,2,3-triazine, 1,2,4-triazine, and 1,3,5-triazine.

Other aromatic nitrogen heterocycles are pyridines with one ring nitrogen atom, diazines with 2 nitrogen atoms in the ring, triazoles with 3 nitrogens in a 5-membered ring, and tetrazines with 4 ring nitrogen atoms.

== Uses ==
=== Melamine ===
A well known triazine is melamine (2,4,6-triamino-1,3,5-triazine). With three amino substituents, melamine is a precursor to commercial resins. Guanamines are closely related to melamine, except with one amino substituent replaced by an organic group. This difference is exploited in the use of guanamines to modify the crosslinking density in melamine resins. Some commercially important guanamines are benzoguanamine and acetoguanamine.

Structure of a guanamine, R = alkyl, aryl, etc.

=== Cyanuric chloride ===
Another important triazine is cyanuric chloride (2,4,6-trichloro-1,3,5-triazine). Chlorine-substituted triazines are components of reactive dyes. These compounds react through a chlorine group with hydroxyl groups present in cellulose fibres in nucleophilic substitution, the other triazine positions contain chromophores. Triazine compounds are often used as the basis for various herbicides, e.g. atrazine.

=== Pharmacology ===
Triazines are an uncommon but known moiety in pharmaceuticals. Lamotrigine is an antiepileptic drug containing a 1,2,4-triazine, while azacitidine is a chemotherapy drug containing a 1,3,5-triazine.

=== Other ===
Triazines also have wide use in the oil and gas and petroleum processing industries as a non-regenerating sulfide removal agent: they are applied to fluid streams to remove hydrogen sulfide gas and mercaptan species, which can decrease the quality of the processed hydrocarbon and be harmful to pipeline and facility infrastructure if not removed.

== Synthesis ==
The more common 1,3,5-isomers are prepared by trimerization of nitrile and cyanide compounds, although more specialized methods are known.

The 1,2,3- and 1,2,4-triazines are more specialized methods. The former family of triazines can be synthesized by thermal rearrangement of 2-azidocyclopropenes. Also mainly of specialized interest, the 1,2,4-isomer is prepared from condensation of 1,2-dicarbonyl compounds with amidrazones. A classical synthesis is also the Bamberger triazine synthesis.

== Reactions ==
Although triazines are aromatic compounds, their resonance energy is much lower than in benzene. Electrophilic aromatic substitution is difficult but nucleophilic aromatic substitution easier than typical chlorinated benzenes. 2,4,6-Trichloro-1,3,5-triazine is easily hydrolyzed to cyanuric acid by heating with water. 2,4,6-Tris(phenoxy)-1,3,5-triazine results when the trichloride is treated with phenol. With amines, one or more chloride is displaced. The remaining chlorides are reactive, and this theme is the basis of the large field of reactive dyes.

Cyanuric chloride assists in the amidation of carboxylic acids.

The 1,2,4-triazines can react with electron-rich dienophiles in an inverse electron demand Diels-Alder reaction. This forms a bicyclic intermediate which normally then extrudes a molecule of nitrogen gas to form an aromatic ring again. In this way the 1,2,4-triazines can be reacted with alkynes to form pyridine rings. An alternative to using an alkyne is to use norbornadiene which can be thought of as a masked alkyne.

1,2,3-triazines undergo Zincke-like nucleophilic substitution with secondary amines to give β-amino aldehydes.

In 2007, a method for synthesizing highly porous triazine-based polymers was discovered, and found to be useful (in conjunction with palladium) for the selective reduction of phenols.

=== Ligands ===
A series of 1,2,4-triazine derivatives known as bis-triazinyl bipyridines (BTPs) have been considered as possible extractants for use in the advanced nuclear reprocessing. BTPs are molecules containing a pyridine ring bonded to two 1,2,4-triazin-3-yl groups.

Triazine-based ligands have been used to bind three dinuclear arene ruthenium (or osmium) compounds to form metallaprisms.

== See also ==
- Hexahydro-1,3,5-triazine
- 6-membered rings with one nitrogen atom: pyridine
- 6-membered rings with two nitrogen atoms: diazines
- 6-membered rings with four nitrogen atoms: tetrazines
- 6-membered rings with five nitrogen atoms: pentazine
- 6-membered rings with six nitrogen atoms: hexazine
