= Allotropy =

Property of some chemical elements to exist in two or more different forms

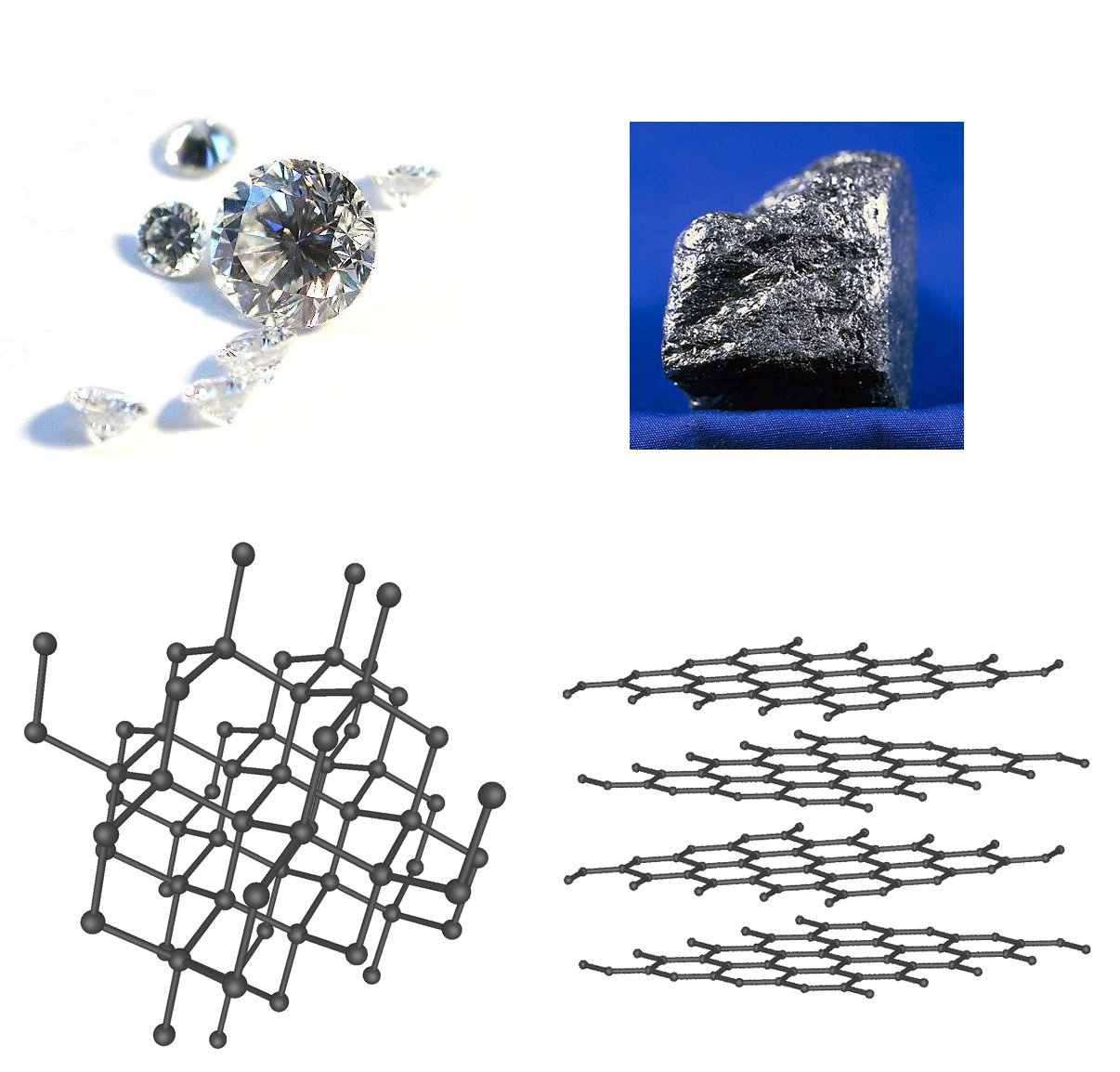
Diamond and graphite are two allotropes of carbon: pure forms of the same element that differ in crystalline structure.

Allotropy or allotropism (from Ancient Greek ἄλλος (allos) 'other' and τρόπος (tropos) 'manner, form') is the property of some chemical elements to exist in two or more different forms, in the same physical state, known as allotropes of the elements. Allotropes are different structural modifications of an element: the atoms of the element are bonded together in different manners. For example, the allotropes of carbon include diamond (the carbon atoms are bonded together to form a cubic lattice of tetrahedra), graphite (the carbon atoms are bonded together in sheets of a hexagonal lattice), graphene (single sheets of graphite), and fullerenes (the carbon atoms are bonded together in spherical, tubular, or ellipsoidal formations).

The term allotropy is used for elements only, not for compounds. The more general term, used for any compound, is polymorphism, although its use is usually restricted to solid materials such as crystals. Allotropy refers only to different forms of an element within the same physical phase (the state of matter, i.e. plasmas, gases, liquids, or solids). The differences between these states of matter would not alone constitute examples of allotropy. Allotropes of chemical elements are frequently referred to as polymorphs or as phases of the element.

For some elements, allotropes have different molecular formulae or different crystalline structures, as well as a difference in physical phase; for example, two allotropes of oxygen (dioxygen, O_{2}, and ozone, O_{3}) can both exist in the solid, liquid and gaseous states. Other elements do not maintain distinct allotropes in different physical phases; for example, phosphorus has numerous solid allotropes, which all revert to the same P_{4} form when melted to the liquid state.

Comparison of Isomerism, Allotropy, and Polymorphism
Feature	Isomerism (Isomers)	Allotropy (Allotropes)	Polymorphism (Polymorphs)
Core Concept	Molecules with identical molecular formulas but distinct structural arrangements or spatial orientations.	Distinct structural modifications of a single element within the same physical state.	The capacity of a solid compound or element to manifest in multiple distinct crystal lattices.
Scope of Applicability	Compounds and molecules (organic and inorganic).	Elements exclusively.	Crystalline solids (elements, ionic salts, or molecular solids).
Structural Variation	Variations in chemical bonding, atom connectivity, or three-dimensional spatial geometry.	Variations in bonding patterns, molecular formulas, or crystal structures of an element.	Variations in the packing arrangements or space groups of atoms or molecules in a solid.
Chemical Properties	Significant variances in reactivity and functionality (e.g., ethanol versus dimethyl ether).	Marked divergence in chemical reactivity (e.g., the inertness of diamond versus the reactivity of graphite).	Identity in liquid or gaseous phases; minor variations in solid-state surface reactivity.
Physical Properties	Variances in boiling points, melting points, and densities.	Radical divergence in characteristics (e.g., the transparency and hardness of diamond versus the opacity and softness of graphite).	Distinct variations in solubility, hardness, density, and melting points.
Physical State	Gas, liquid, and solid phases.	Predominantly solid phases, with occurrences in liquid and gas phases (e.g., dioxygen versus ozone gas).	Crystalline solids exclusively.
Primary Mechanism	Alternative modes of atomic linkage, functional group placement, or molecular rotation.	Alternative modes of homonuclear bonding and molecular aggregation.	Thermodynamic variations in temperature and pressure during the process of crystallization.
Examples	Butane and isobutane; Ethanol and dimethyl ether	Carbon allotropes: Diamond, graphite, graphene, and fullerenes; Oxygen allotropes: Dioxygen and ozone	Calcium carbonate forms: Calcite and aragonite; Titanium dioxide forms: Rutile, anatase, and brookite; Carbon systems: Diamond and graphite (classified concurrently as allotropes and polymorphs)

== History ==
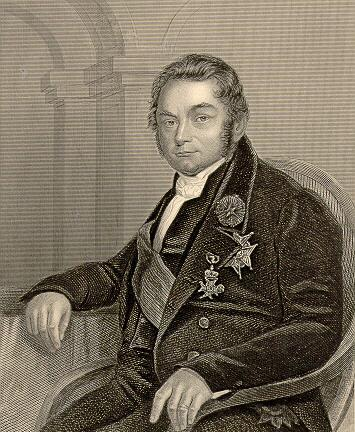
Portrait by Olof Johan Södermark (1790–1848). Print Artist: Charles W. Sharpe, d. 1875(76)

The concept of allotropy was originally proposed in 1840 by the Swedish scientist Baron Jöns Jakob Berzelius (Swedish: [jœ̌ns ˈjɑ̂ːkɔb bæˈʂěːlɪɵs]; 1779–1848). The term is derived from Greek άλλοτροπἱα (allotropia) 'variability, changeableness'. After the acceptance of Avogadro's hypothesis in 1860, it was understood that elements could exist as polyatomic molecules, and two allotropes of oxygen were recognized as O_{2} and O_{3}. In the early 20th century, it was recognized that other cases such as carbon were due to differences in crystal structure.

By 1912, Ostwald noted that the allotropy of elements is just a special case of the phenomenon of polymorphism known for compounds, and proposed that the terms allotrope and allotropy be abandoned and replaced by polymorph and polymorphism. Although many other chemists have repeated this advice, IUPAC and most chemistry texts still favour the usage of allotrope and allotropy for elements only.

== Differences in properties of an element's allotropes ==
Allotropes are different structural forms of the same element and can exhibit quite different physical properties and chemical behaviours. The change between allotropic forms is triggered by the same forces that affect other structures, i.e., pressure, light, and temperature. Therefore, the stability of the particular allotropes depends on particular conditions. For instance, iron changes from a body-centered cubic structure (ferrite) to a face-centered cubic structure (austenite) above 906 °C, and tin undergoes a modification known as tin pest from a metallic form to a semimetallic form below 13.2 °C (55.8 °F). As an example of allotropes having different chemical behaviour, ozone (O_{3}) is a much stronger oxidizing agent than dioxygen (O_{2}).

== List of allotropes ==
Typically, elements capable of variable coordination number and/or oxidation states tend to exhibit greater numbers of allotropic forms. Another contributing factor is the ability of an element to catenate.

Examples of allotropes include:

=== Non-metals ===
Element	Allotropes
Carbon	Diamond – an extremely hard, transparent crystal, with the carbon atoms arranged in a tetrahedral lattice. A poor electrical conductor. An excellent thermal conductor.; Lonsdaleite – also called hexagonal diamond.; Graphene – is the basic structural element of other allotropes, nanotubes, charcoal, and fullerenes.; Q-carbon – a ferromagnetic, tough, and brilliant crystal structure that is harder and brighter than diamonds.; Graphite – a semimetallic, soft, black, flaky solid, a good electrical conductor. The C atoms are bonded in flat hexagonal lattices (graphene), which are then layered in sheets.; Linear acetylenic carbon (carbyne); Amorphous carbon; Fullerenes, including buckminsterfullerene, also known as "buckyballs", such as C_{60}.; Carbon nanotubes – allotropes having a cylindrical nanostructure.; Schwarzites; Cyclocarbon; Glassy carbon; Superdense carbon allotropes – proposed allotropes
Nitrogen	Dinitrogen – by far the most common and stable form of nitrogen, found in the air.; Hexazine; Hexanitrogen; Octaazacubane; Tetranitrogen; Trinitrogen; Solid nitrogen
Phosphorus	White phosphorus – crystalline solid of tetraphosphorus (P_{4}) molecules; Red phosphorus – amorphous polymeric solid; Scarlet phosphorus; Violet phosphorus with monoclinic crystalline structure; Black phosphorus – semiconductor, analogous to graphite; Diphosphorus – gaseous form composed of P_{2} molecules, stable between 1200 °C and 2000 °C; created e.g. by dissociation of P_{4} molecules of white phosphorus at around 827 °C
Oxygen	Dioxygen, O_{2} – colorless (faint blue liquid and solid); Ozone, O_{3} – blue; Tetraoxygen, O_{4} – metastable; Octaoxygen, O_{8} – red
Sulfur	Cyclo-Pentasulfur, Cyclo-S_{5}; Cyclo-Hexasulfur, Cyclo-S_{6}; Cyclo-Heptasulfur, Cyclo-S_{7}; Cyclo-Octasulfur, Cyclo-S_{8}
Selenium	"Red selenium", cyclo-Se_{8}; Gray selenium, polymeric Se; Black selenium, irregular polymeric rings up to 1000 atoms long; Monoclinic selenium, dark red transparent crystals
Spin isomers of hydrogen	Orthohydrogen, H_{2} with nuclear spins aligned parallel; Parahydrogen, H_{2} with nuclear spins aligned antiparallel; These nuclear spin isomers have sometimes been described as allotropes, notably by the committee which awarded the 1932 Nobel prize to Werner Heisenberg for quantum mechanics and singled out the "allotropic forms of hydrogen" as its most notable application.

=== Metalloids ===
Element	Allotropes
Boron	Amorphous boron – brown powder – B_{12} regular icosahedra; α-rhombohedral boron; β-rhombohedral boron; γ-orthorhombic boron; α-tetragonal boron; β-tetragonal boron; Cubic boron; High-pressure superconducting phase; Borophene; Borospherene, B_{40}
Silicon	Amorphous silicon; α-silicon, a semiconductor, diamond cubic structure; β-silicon - metallic, with the BCC similar to molybdenum and beta-tin (High Pressure Phase); Q-Silicon - a ferromagnetic (Similar to Q-Carbon) and highly conductive phase of silicon (similar to graphite); Silicene, buckled planar single layer Silicon, similar to Graphene
Germanium	Amorphous germanium; α-germanium – semimetallic element or semiconductor, with the same structure as diamond (similar chemical properties with sulfur and silicon); β-germanium – metallic, with the same structure as beta-tin; Germanene – Buckled planar Germanium, similar to graphene
Arsenic	Yellow arsenic – molecular non-metallic As_{4}, with the same structure as white phosphorus (Similar chemical properties with nitrogen and phosphorus); Gray arsenic, polymeric As (metallic, though heavily anisotropic) (similar to aluminum and antimony in chemical properties); Black arsenic – molecular and non-metallic, with the same structure as red phosphorus
Antimony	Blue-white antimony – stable form (metallic), with the same structure as gray arsenic (similar to arsenic in chemical properties); Black antimony (non-metallic and amorphous, only stable as a thin layer)
Tellurium	Amorphous tellurium – gray-black or brown powder; Crystalline tellurium – hexagonal crystalline structure (metalloid) (similar chemical properties with selenium)

=== Metals ===
Among the metallic elements that occur in nature in significant quantities (56 up to U, without Tc and Pm), almost half (27) are allotropic at ambient pressure: Li, Be, Na, Ca, Ti, Mn, Fe, Co, Sr, Y, Zr, Sn, La, Ce, Pr, Nd, Sm, Gd, Tb, Dy, Yb, Hf, Tl, Th, Pa and U. Some phase transitions between allotropic forms of technologically relevant metals are those of Ti at 882 °C, Fe at 912 °C and 1,394 °C, Co at 422 °C, Zr at 863 °C, Sn at 13 °C and U at 668 °C and 776 °C.

Element	Phase name(s)	Space group	Pearson symbol	Structure type	Description
Lithium	α-Li	R3̅m	hR9	α-Sm	Forms below 70 K.
Lithium	β-Li	Im3̅m	cI2	W	Stable at room temperature and pressure.
Lithium		Fm3̅m	cF4	Cu	Forms above 7GPa
Lithium		R3̅m	hR1	α-Hg	An intermediate phase formed ~40GPa.
Lithium		I4̅3d	cI16		Forms above 40GPa.
Lithium			oC88		Forms between 60 and 70 GPa.
Lithium			oC40		Forms between 70 and 95 GPa.
Lithium			oC24		Forms above 95 GPa.
Beryllium	α-Be	P6_{3}/mmc	hP2	Mg	Stable at room temperature and pressure.
Beryllium	β-Be	Im3̅m	cI2	W	Forms above 1255 °C.
Sodium	α-Na	R3̅m	hR9	α-Sm	Forms below 20 K.
Sodium	β-Na	Im3̅m	cI2	W	Stable at room temperature and pressure.
Sodium		Fm3̅m	cF4	Cu	Forms at room temperature above 65 GPa.
Sodium		I4̅3d	cI16		Forms at room temperature, 108GPa.
Sodium		Pnma	oP8	MnP	Forms at room temperature, 119GPa.
Sodium			tI19*		A host-guest structure that forms above between 125 and 180 GPa.
Sodium			hP4		Forms above 180 GPa.
Magnesium		P6_{3}/mmc	hP2	Mg	Stable at room temperature and pressure.
Magnesium		Im3̅m	cI2	W	Forms above 50 GPa.
Aluminium	α-Al	Fm3̅m	cF4	Cu	Stable at room temperature and pressure.
Aluminium	β-Al	P6_{3}/mmc	hP2	Mg	Forms above 20.5 GPa.
Potassium		Im3̅m	cI2	W	Stable at room temperature and pressure.
Potassium		Fm3̅m	cF4	Cu	Forms above 11.7 GPa.
Potassium		I4/mcm	tI19*		A host-guest structure that forms at about 20 GPa.
Potassium		P6_{3}/mmc	hP4	NiAs	Forms above 25 GPa.
Potassium		Pnma	oP8	MnP	Forms above 58GPa.
Potassium		I4_{1}/amd	tI4		Forms above 112 GPa.
Potassium		Cmca	oC16		Formas above 112 GPa.
Iron	α-Fe, ferrite	Im3̅m	cI2	Body-centered cubic	Stable at room temperature and pressure. Ferromagnetic at T<770 °C, paramagnetic from T=770–912 °C.
Iron	γ-iron, austenite	Fm3̅m	cF4	Face-centered cubic	Stable from 912 to 1,394 °C.
Iron	δ-iron	Im3̅m	cI2	Body-centered cubic	Stable from 1,394 – 1,538 °C, same structure as α-Fe.
Iron	ε-iron, Hexaferrum	P6_{3}/mmc	hP2	Hexagonal close-packed	Stable at high pressures.
Cobalt	α-Cobalt			hexagonal-close packed	Forms below 450 °C.
Cobalt	β-Cobalt			face centered cubic	Forms above 450 °C.
Cobalt	ε-Cobalt	P4_{1}32		primitive cubic	Forms from thermal decomposition of [Co_{2}(CO)_{8}]. Nanoallotrope.
Rubidium	α-Rb	Im3̅m	cI2	W	Stable at room temperature and pressure.
Rubidium			cF4		Forms above 7 GPa.
Rubidium			oC52		Forms above 13 GPa.
Rubidium			tI19*		Forms above 17 GPa.
Rubidium			tI4		Forms above 20 GPa.
Rubidium			oC16		Forms above 48 GPa.
Tin	α-tin, gray tin, tin pest	Fd3̅m	cF8	d-C	Stable below 13.2 °C.
Tin	β-tin, white tin	I4_{1}/amd	tI4	β-Sn	Stable at room temperature and pressure.
Tin	γ-tin, rhombic tin	I4/mmm	tI2	In	Forms above 10 GPa.
Tin	γ'-Sn	Immm	oI2	MoPt_{2}	Forms above 30 GPa.
Tin	σ-Sn, γ"-Sn	Im3̅m	cI2	W	Forms above 41 GPa. Forms at very high pressure.
Tin	δ-Sn	P6_{3}/mmc	hP2	Mg	Forms above 157 GPa.
Tin	Stanene				
Polonium	α-Polonium			simple cubic	
Polonium	β-Polonium			rhombohedral	

Most stable structure under standard conditions.
Structures stable below room temperature.
Structures stable above room temperature.
Structures stable above atmospheric pressure.

==== Lanthanides and actinides ====
Phase diagram of the actinide elements.

- Cerium, samarium, dysprosium and ytterbium have three allotropes.
- Praseodymium, neodymium, gadolinium and terbium have two allotropes.
- Plutonium has six distinct solid allotropes under "normal" pressures. Their densities vary within a ratio of some 4:3, which vastly complicates all kinds of work with the metal (particularly casting, machining, and storage). A seventh plutonium allotrope exists at very high pressures. The transuranium metals Np, Am, and Cm are also allotropic.
- Promethium, americium, berkelium and californium have three allotropes each.

== Nanoallotropes ==
In 2017, the concept of nanoallotropy was proposed. Nanoallotropes, or allotropes of nanomaterials, are nanoporous materials that have the same chemical composition (e.g., Au), but differ in their architecture at the nanoscale (that is, on a scale 10 to 100 times the dimensions of individual atoms). Such nanoallotropes may help create ultra-small electronic devices and find other industrial applications. The different nanoscale architectures translate into different properties, as was demonstrated for surface-enhanced Raman scattering performed on several different nanoallotropes of gold. A two-step method for generating nanoallotropes was also created.

== See also ==
- Isomer
- Polymorphism (materials science)
