= Allotropes of oxygen =

Different forms of the 8th element of Periodic Table

Oxygen, _{8}O
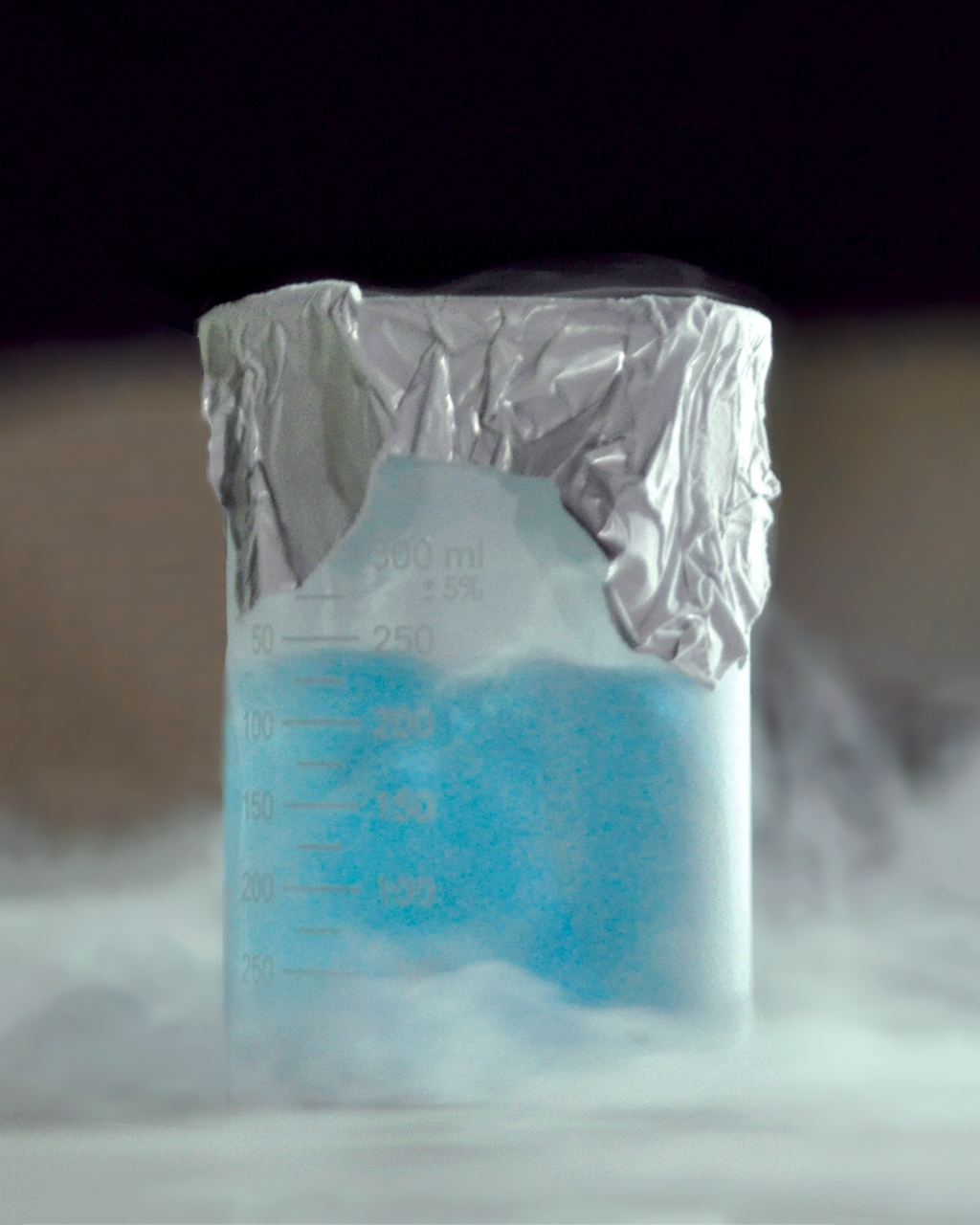
- Liquid oxygen (O_{2} at below −183 °C)

Oxygen
- Allotropes: O_{2}, O_{3} (ozone) and more (see Allotropes of oxygen)
- Appearance: gas: colorless liquid and solid: pale blue

Standard atomic weight A_{r}°(O)
- [15.99903, 15.99977]; 15.999±0.001 (abridged)

Oxygen in the periodic table
Hydrogen																															Helium
Lithium	Beryllium																									Boron	Carbon	Nitrogen	Oxygen	Fluorine	Neon
Sodium	Magnesium																									Aluminium	Silicon	Phosphorus	Sulfur	Chlorine	Argon
Potassium	Calcium															Scandium	Titanium	Vanadium	Chromium	Manganese	Iron	Cobalt	Nickel	Copper	Zinc	Gallium	Germanium	Arsenic	Selenium	Bromine	Krypton
Rubidium	Strontium															Yttrium	Zirconium	Niobium	Molybdenum	Technetium	Ruthenium	Rhodium	Palladium	Silver	Cadmium	Indium	Tin	Antimony	Tellurium	Iodine	Xenon
Caesium	Barium	Lanthanum	Cerium	Praseodymium	Neodymium	Promethium	Samarium	Europium	Gadolinium	Terbium	Dysprosium	Holmium	Erbium	Thulium	Ytterbium	Lutetium	Hafnium	Tantalum	Tungsten	Rhenium	Osmium	Iridium	Platinum	Gold	Mercury (element)	Thallium	Lead	Bismuth	Polonium	Astatine	Radon
Francium	Radium	Actinium	Thorium	Protactinium	Uranium	Neptunium	Plutonium	Americium	Curium	Berkelium	Californium	Einsteinium	Fermium	Mendelevium	Nobelium	Lawrencium	Rutherfordium	Dubnium	Seaborgium	Bohrium	Hassium	Meitnerium	Darmstadtium	Roentgenium	Copernicium	Nihonium	Flerovium	Moscovium	Livermorium	Tennessine	Oganesson
–
↑
O
↓
S
nitrogen ← oxygen → fluorine
- Atomic number (Z): 8
- Group: group 16 (chalcogens)
- Period: period 2
- Block: p-block
- Electron configuration: [He] 2s^{2} 2p^{4}
- Electrons per shell: 2, 6

Physical properties
- Phase at STP: gas
- Melting point: (O_{2}) 54.36 K (−218.79 °C, −361.82 °F)
- Boiling point: (O_{2}) 90.188 K (−182.962 °C, −297.332 °F)
- Density (at STP): 1.429 g/L
- when liquid (at b.p.): 1.141 g/cm^{3}
- Triple point: 54.361 K, 0.1463 kPa
- Critical point: 154.581 K, 5.043 MPa
- Heat of fusion: (O_{2}) 0.444 kJ/mol
- Heat of vaporization: (O_{2}) 6.82 kJ/mol
- Molar heat capacity: 14.689 J/(mol·K) (O); 29.378 J/(mol·K) (O_{2})
- Specific heat capacity: 918.12 J/(kg·K) (O)
Vapor pressure
P (Pa)	1	10	100	1 k	10 k	100 k
at T (K)				61	73	90

Atomic properties
- Oxidation states: common: −2 −1, 0, +1, +2
- Electronegativity: Pauling scale: 3.44
- Ionization energies: 1st: 1313.9 kJ/mol; 2nd: 3388.3 kJ/mol; 3rd: 5300.5 kJ/mol; (more)
- Covalent radius: 66±2 pm
- Van der Waals radius: 152 pm
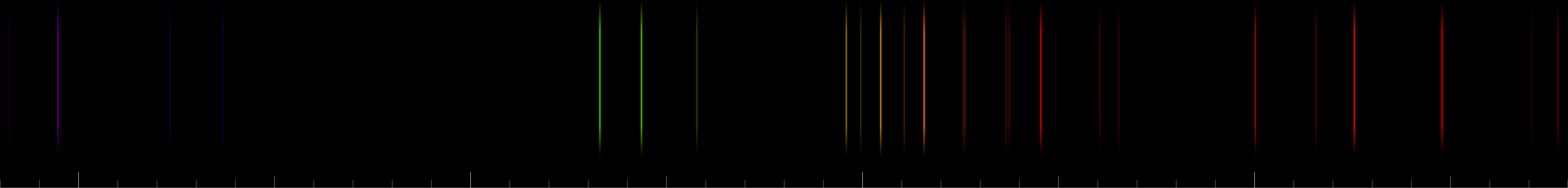
- Spectral lines of oxygen

Other properties
- Natural occurrence: primordial
- Crystal structure: cubic (cP16)
- Lattice constant: a = 678.28 pm (at t.p.)
- Thermal conductivity: 26.58×10^{−3} W/(m⋅K)
- Magnetic ordering: paramagnetic
- Molar magnetic susceptibility: +3449.0×10^{−6} cm^{3}/mol (293 K)
- Speed of sound: 330 m/s (gas, at 27 °C)
- CAS Number: 7782-44-7

History
- Naming: from the Greek ὀξύς (acid, literally 'sharp', from the taste of acids) and -γενής (producer)
- Discovery: Michael Sendivogius; Carl Wilhelm Scheele (1604, 1771)
- Named by: Antoine Lavoisier (1777)

Isotopes of oxygen
Main isotopes			Decay	
Isotope	abundance	half-life (t_{1/2})	mode	product
^{15}O	trace	122.27 s	β^{+}	^{15}N
^{16}O	99.8%	stable		
^{17}O	0.0384%	stable		
^{18}O	0.205%	stable		

There are several known allotropes of oxygen. The most familiar is molecular oxygen (O_{2}), present at significant levels in Earth's atmosphere and also known as dioxygen or triplet oxygen. Another is the highly reactive ozone (O_{3}). Others are:

- Atomic oxygen (O^{•}), a free radical.
- Singlet oxygen (O_{2}*), one of two metastable states of molecular oxygen.
- Tetraoxygen (O_{4}), another metastable form.
- Solid oxygen, existing in six variously colored phases, of which one is octaoxygen (O_{8}, red oxygen) and another one metallic (ζ-oxygen).

== Atomic oxygen ==
Atomic oxygen, denoted O or O^{•}, is very reactive, as the individual atoms of oxygen tend to quickly bond with nearby molecules. Its lowest-energy electronic state is a spin triplet, designated by the term symbol ^{3}P. On Earth's surface, it exists naturally for a very short time. In outer space, the presence of ample ultraviolet radiation results in a low Earth orbit atmosphere in which 96% of the oxygen occurs in atomic form.

Atomic oxygen has been detected on Mars by Mariner, Viking, and the SOFIA observatory.

== Dioxygen ==
The most commonly encountered allotrope of elemental oxygen is triplet dioxygen, a diradical. The unpaired electrons participate in three-electron bonding, shown here using dashed lines.

The common allotrope of elemental oxygen on Earth, O_{2}, is generally known as oxygen, but may be called dioxygen, diatomic oxygen, molecular oxygen, dioxidene, or oxygen gas to distinguish it from the element itself and from the triatomic allotrope ozone, O_{3}. As a major component (about 21% by volume) of Earth's atmosphere, elemental oxygen is most commonly encountered in the diatomic form. Aerobic organisms use atmospheric dioxygen as the terminal oxidant in cellular respiration in order to obtain chemical energy. The ground state of dioxygen is known as triplet oxygen, ^{3}[O_{2}], because it has two unpaired electrons. The first excited state, singlet oxygen, ^{1}[O_{2}], has no unpaired electrons and is metastable. The doublet state requires an odd number of electrons, and so cannot occur in dioxygen without gaining or losing electrons, such as in the superoxide ion (O^{−}_{2}) or the dioxygenyl ion (O^{+}_{2}).

The ground state of O_{2} has a bond length of 121 pm and a bond energy of 498 kJ/mol. It is a colourless gas with a boiling point of −183 °C (90 K; −297 °F). It can be condensed from air by cooling with liquid nitrogen, which has a boiling point of −196 °C (77 K; −321 °F). Liquid oxygen is pale blue in colour, and is quite markedly paramagnetic due to the unpaired electrons; liquid oxygen contained in a flask suspended by a string is attracted to a magnet.

=== Singlet oxygen ===
Singlet oxygen is the common name used for the two metastable states of molecular oxygen (O_{2}) with higher energy than the ground state triplet oxygen. Because of the differences in their electron shells, singlet oxygen has different chemical and physical properties than triplet oxygen, including absorbing and emitting light at different wavelengths. It can be generated in a photosensitized process by energy transfer from dye molecules such as rose bengal, methylene blue or porphyrins, or by chemical processes such as spontaneous decomposition of hydrogen trioxide in water or the reaction of hydrogen peroxide with hypochlorite.

== Ozone ==
Triatomic oxygen (ozone, O_{3}) is a very reactive allotrope of oxygen that is a pale blue gas at standard temperature and pressure. Liquid and solid O_{3} have a deeper blue color than ordinary O_{2}, and they are unstable and explosive. In its gas phase, ozone damages materials like rubber and fabric and damages lung tissue. Traces of it can be detected as a pungent, chlorine-like smell, coming from electric motors, laser printers, and photocopiers, as it is formed whenever air is subjected to an electrical discharge. It was named "ozon" in 1840 by Christian Friedrich Schönbein, from ancient Greek ὄζειν (ozein: "to smell") plus the suffix -on, commonly used at the time to designate a derived compound and anglicized as -one.

Ozone is thermodynamically unstable and tends to react toward the more common dioxygen form. It is formed by reaction of intact O_{2} with atomic oxygen produced when UV radiation in the upper atmosphere splits O_{2}. Ozone absorbs strongly in the ultraviolet and in the stratosphere functions as a shield for the biosphere against mutagenic and other damaging effects of solar UV radiation (see ozone layer). Tropospheric ozone is formed near the Earth's surface by the photochemical disintegration of nitrogen dioxide in the exhaust of automobiles. Ground-level ozone is an air pollutant that is especially harmful for senior citizens (elderly), children, and people with heart and lung conditions such as emphysema, bronchitis, and asthma. The immune system produces ozone as an antimicrobial (see below).

=== Cyclic ozone ===
Cyclic ozone is a theoretically predicted O_{3} molecule in which its three atoms of oxygen bond in an equilateral triangle instead of an open angle.

== Tetraoxygen ==
Tetraoxygen had been suspected to exist since the early 1900s, when it was known as oxozone. It was identified in 2001 by a team led by Fulvio Cacace at the University of Rome. The molecule O_{4} was thought to be in one of the phases of solid oxygen later identified as O_{8}. Cacace's team suggested that O_{4} probably consists of two dumbbell-like O_{2} molecules loosely held together by induced dipole dispersion forces.

== Pentaoxygen ==
Computational analysis of the five-oxygen allotrope suggests it would have a cyclopentane-like structure with an envelope conformation.

== Hexaoxygen ==
Computational analysis of the six-oxygen allotrope suggests it would have a cyclohexane-like structure with chair and twist conformations.

== Phases of solid oxygen ==
There are six known distinct phases of solid oxygen. One of them is a dark-red O_{8} cluster. When oxygen is subjected to a pressure of 96 GPa, it becomes metallic, in a similar manner to hydrogen, and becomes more similar to the heavier chalcogens, such as selenium (exhibiting a pink-red color in its elemental state), tellurium, and polonium, both of which show significant metallic character. At very low temperatures, this phase also becomes superconducting.
