= Octaoxygen =

Allotrope of oxygen

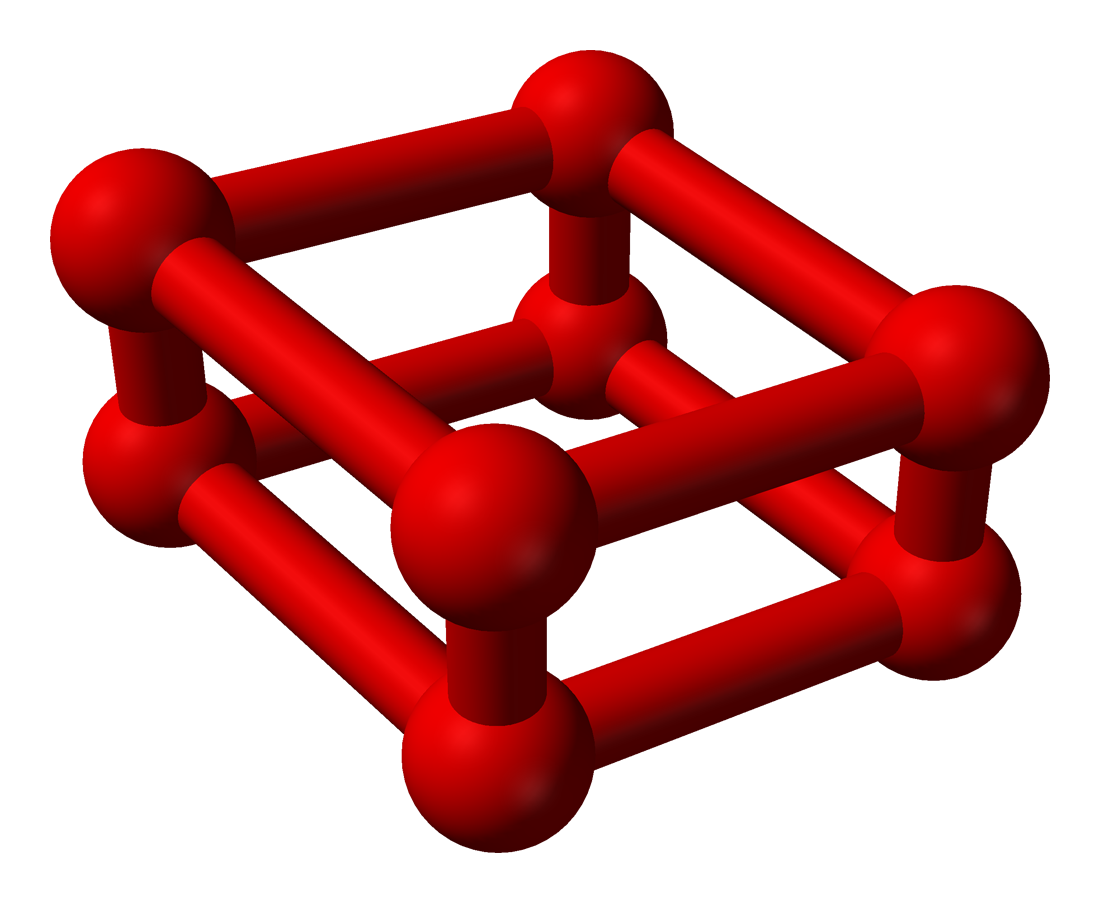
- Ball-and-stick model of O_{8}

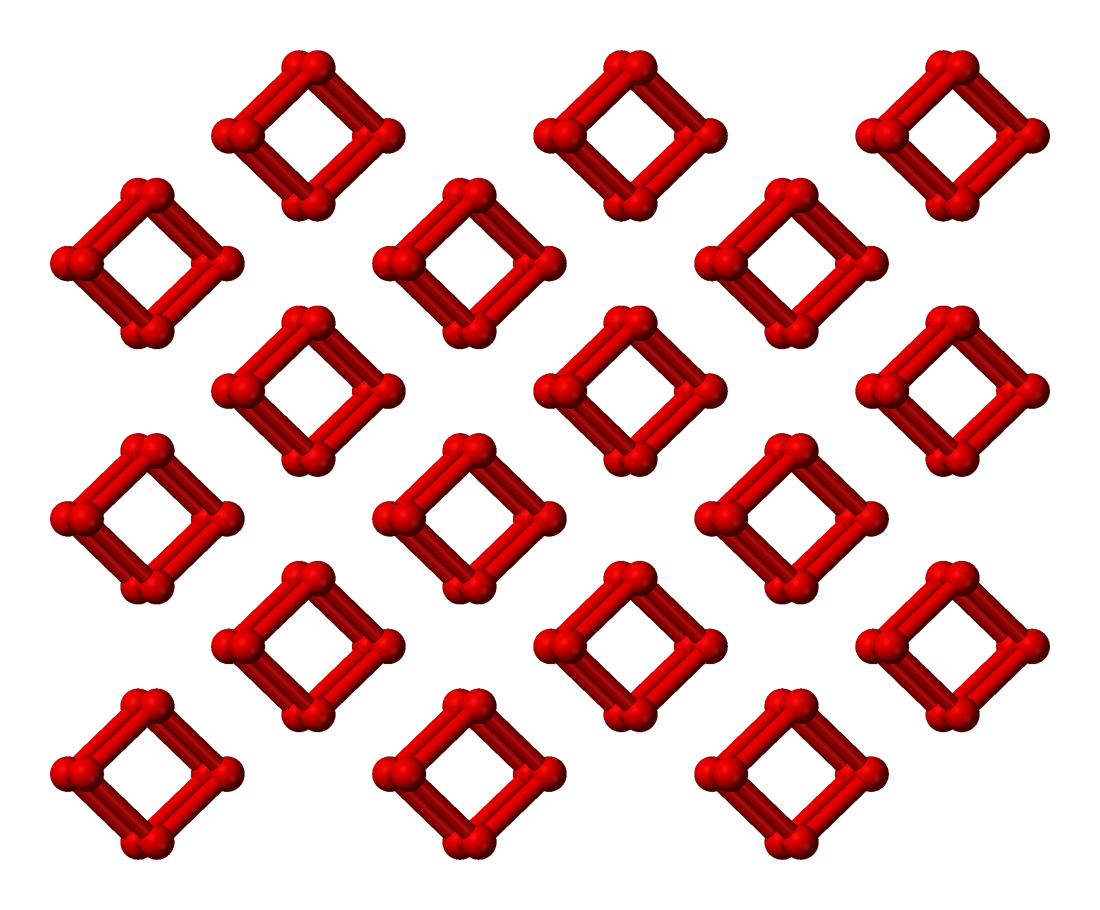
- Part of the crystal structure of ε-oxygen

Names
- Other names: ε-Oxygen; epsilon oxygen; Red oxygen

Identifiers
CAS Number	176740-46-8

Properties
Chemical formula	O_{8}
Molar mass	127.992 g·mol^{−1}
Appearance	Deep red
- Except where otherwise noted, data are given for materials in their standard state (at 25 °C [77 °F], 100 kPa). Infobox references

Octaoxygen, also known as ε-oxygen or red oxygen, is an allotrope of oxygen consisting of eight oxygen atoms. This allotrope forms at high pressure and remains stable across a wide pressure range at room temperature (between 10 and 96 GPa). If it is further compressed past 96 GPa, then it transitions into a metallic, superconducting state.

The material is dark red and, unlike other allotropes of oxygen, has no magnetic character, due to its unpaired electrons being forced to overlap.

== Preparation and properties ==
As the pressure of oxygen at room temperature is increased above 10 gigapascals (1,500,000 psi), it undergoes a dramatic phase transition to the 𝛆-phase allotrope. Its volume decreases significantly, and it changes color from sky-blue to deep red. This ε-phase was discovered in 1979, but the structure was unclear. A crystal lattice of tetraoxygen O_{4} units was suggested in 1999, based on infrared spectroscopy. However, in 2006, two independent groups showed by X-ray crystallography that the structure was a rhomboid O_{8} ((O_{2})_{4}) cluster consisting of four O_{2} molecules.

(O2)4, which exhibits strong bonds in the diatomic units but with much weaker π*–π* bonds between them

In this phase, it exhibits a dark-red color, very strong infrared absorption, and a magnetic collapse. It has been shown to have a monoclinic C2/m symmetry, and its infrared absorption behaviour was attributed to the association of oxygen molecules into larger units. At 11 GPa, the intra-cluster bond length of the O_{8} cluster is 2.34 Å, and the inter-cluster distance is 2.66 Å, both longer than the 1.2 Å bond-length in the oxygen molecule (O_{2}). It is stable over a very large pressure domain, from 10 GPa to 96 GPa. Above 96 GPa, ζ-oxygen forms which is metallic and superconductive; ε-oxygen is non-conductive.

The formation mechanism of the O_{8} cluster found in the work is not clear yet, and the researchers think that the charge transfer between oxygen molecules or the magnetic moment of oxygen molecules has a significant role in the formation.

== Potential applications ==
Liquid oxygen is already used as an oxidant in rockets, and it has been speculated that octaoxygen could make an even better oxidant, because of its higher energy density.
