= Tetranitrogen =

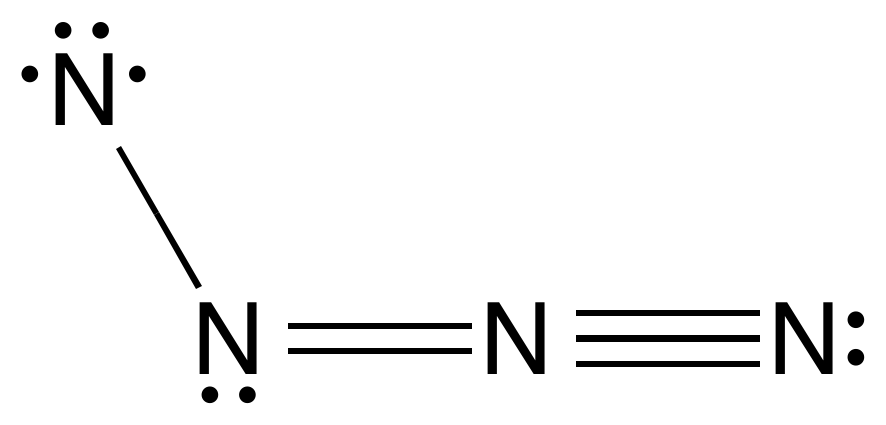

Names
- IUPAC name tetranitrogen

Identifiers
CAS Number	Tetrazete: 42851-09-2; tetrahedral: 12596-63-3; 147363-92-6
3D model (JSmol)	Tetrazete: Interactive image; tetrahedral: Interactive image
ChemSpider	Tetrazete: 21378131
PubChem CID	Tetrazete: 71363144; tetrahedral: 53432676
- InChI: Tetrazete: InChI=1S/N4/c1-2-4-3-1 Key: SSOWKQVDUZHCLS-UHFFFAOYSA-N; tetrahedral: InChI=1S/N4/c1-2-3(1)4(1)2 Key: LVXZGECMVPLXCK-UHFFFAOYSA-N
- SMILES: Tetrazete: N1=NN=N1; tetrahedral: N12N3N1N23

Properties
Chemical formula	N_{4}
Molar mass	56.0268
- Except where otherwise noted, data are given for materials in their standard state (at 25 °C [77 °F], 100 kPa). Infobox references

Tetranitrogen is a neutrally charged polynitrogen allotrope of the chemical formula N_{4} and consists of four nitrogen atoms. The tetranitrogen cation is the positively charged ion, N^{+}_{4}, which is more stable than the neutral tetranitrogen molecule and is thus more studied. Tetranitrogen anions (N^{2−}_{4} and N^{4−}_{4}) have also been reported.

== History ==
Polynitrogen compounds have been well known and characterized by chemists for many years. The commonplace molecular (diatomic) nitrogen (N_{2}) was first isolated by Daniel Rutherford in 1772 and the azide ion (N^{−}_{3}) was discovered by Theodor Curtius in 1890. Discoveries of other related nitrogenous allotypes during the twentieth century include atomic nitrogen and the radical molecule N^{•}_{3}. However, none of these complexes could be isolated or synthesized on a macroscopic scale like N_{2} and azide; it was not until 1999 that a large scale synthesis was devised for a third nitrogen allotrope, the pentazenium (N^{+}_{5}) cation. This increased interest in polynitrogen compounds in the late twentieth century was due to the advance of computational chemistry which predicted that these types of molecules could be used as potential high-energy-density matter (HEDM) sources.

The N^{+}_{4} cation was first discovered in 1958 upon analysis of anomalous background peaks of molecular weight 56+ and 42+ in the mass spectra of molecular nitrogen, which corresponded with formation of N^{+}_{4} and N^{+}_{3}, respectively. Explicit synthesis of N^{+}_{4} was first carried out in 1984 by a similar mechanism of electron bombardment of N_{2}. Theoretical chemistry predicted several possible synthesis mechanisms for N_{4} including reaction of a neutral N atom with a N^{•}_{3} radical, binding of two N_{2} molecules in the excited state, and extrusion from polycyclic compounds, none of which could be accomplished experimentally. However, in 2002 a method for synthesis of tetranitrogen was devised from the deionization of N^{+}_{4} through neutralization-reionization mass spectrometry (NRMS). In the synthesis, N^{+}_{4} (which was first formed in the ionization chamber of the mass spectrometer) underwent two high energy collision events. During the first collision, N^{+}_{4} contacted a target gas, CH_{4}, to yield a small percentage of neutral N_{4} molecules.

N^{+}_{4} + CH_{4} → N_{4} + CH^{+}_{4}

A deflecting electrode was used to remove any unreacted N^{+}_{4} ions as well as the target gas, CH_{4}, and any additional unintended reaction products, leaving a stream of N_{4} molecules. In order to affirm the synthesis and isolation of N_{4}, this stream then underwent a second collision event, contacting a second target gas, O_{2}, reforming the N^{+}_{4} cation.

N_{4} + O_{2} → N^{+}_{4} + O^{−}_{2}

The disappearance and reemergence of this "recovery peak" confirms the completion of both reactions, providing ample evidence for the synthesis of N_{4} by this method. As the "flight time" between the two reactions, carried out in separate chambers of the mass spectrometer, was on the order of 1 μs, the N_{4} molecule has a lifetime of at least this long.

== Characteristics ==
Since its discovery, N_{4} has not been well studied. It is a gas at room temperature (298 K, 25 °C, 77 °F). It also has a lifetime in excess of 1 μs, though it is predicted to be characterized as metastable. Due to its instability, the N_{4} molecule readily disassociates into two more-stable N_{2} molecules. This process is very exothermic, releasing around 800 kJ mol^{−1} of energy.

Ab initio calculations in the neutral molecular suggest that previously proposed rectangular or tetrahedral structures, analogous to cyclobutadiene and tetrahedrane, respectively, are not likely to be the most thermodynamically stable. Instead, the ground state is expected to be a bent or zig-zag linear chain of the four nitrogen atoms containing two unpaired electrons on one of the terminal nitrogen atoms—essentially an azido-nitrene.

The structure of N^{+}_{4} has been predicted by theoretical experiments and confirmed by experimental techniques involving collisionally activated dissociation mass spectrometry (CADMS). This technique bombards N^{+}_{4}-producing fragments which can then be analyzed by tandem mass spectrometry. Based on the fragments observed, a structure was determined involving two pairs of triple-bonded nitrogen atoms (two N_{2} units) that are associated with each other with a longer, weaker bond.

== Applications ==
Tetranitrogen and other similar polynitrogen compounds are predicted to be good candidates for use as high-energy-density matter (HEDM), high-energy fuel sources with small weight in comparison with traditional liquid- and fuel-cell-based energy sources. The N≡N triple bond of N_{2} is much stronger (energy of formation of 229 kcal/mol) than either an equivalent one and a half N=N double bonds (100 kcal/mol, i.e. 150 kcal/mol total) or an equivalent three N−N single bonds (38.4 kcal/mol, i.e. 115 kcal/mol total). Due to this, polynitrogen molecules are expected to readily break down into harmless N_{2} gas, in the process releasing large amounts of chemical energy. This is in contrast to carbon-containing compounds which have lower energies of formation for an equivalent number of single or double bonds than for a C≡C triple bond, allowing for the thermodynamically favorable formation of polymers. It is for this reason that the only allotropic form of nitrogen found in nature is molecular nitrogen (N_{2}) and why novel strategies of synthesizing polynitrogen allotropes in a cost-efficient manner are so highly sought after.

== See also ==
- Allotropes of nitrogen
- Tetraphosphorus (white phosphorus)
- Tetraarsenic (yellow arsenic)
- Tetraoxygen
