= Solid oxygen =

Oxygen in solid state

Solid oxygen is the solid ice phase of oxygen. It forms below 54.36 K (−218.79 °C; −361.82 °F) at standard atmospheric pressure. Solid oxygen O_{2}, like liquid oxygen, is a clear substance with a light sky-blue color caused by absorption in the red part of the visible light spectrum.

Oxygen molecules have a relationship between the molecular magnetization and crystal structures, electronic structures, and superconductivity. Oxygen is the only simple diatomic molecule (and one of the few molecules in general) to carry a magnetic moment. This makes solid oxygen particularly interesting, as it is considered a "spin-controlled" crystal that displays antiferromagnetic magnetic order in the low temperature phases. The magnetic properties of oxygen have been studied extensively. At very high pressures, solid oxygen changes from an insulating to a metallic state; and at very low temperatures, it transforms to a superconducting state. Structural investigations of solid oxygen began in the 1920s and, at present, six distinct crystallographic phases are established unambiguously.

The density of solid oxygen ranges from 21 cm^{3}/mol in the α-phase, to 23.5 cm^{3}/mol in the γ-phase.

== Phases ==
Phase diagram for solid oxygen

Six different phases of solid oxygen are known to exist:

1. α-phase: light blue – forms at 1 atm, below 23.8 K, monoclinic crystal structure, space group C2/m (no. 12).
2. β-phase: faint blue to pink – forms at 1 atm, below 43.8 K, rhombohedral crystal structure, space group R3̅m (no. 166). At room temperature and high pressure begins transformation to tetraoxygen.
3. γ-phase: faint blue – forms at 1 atm, below 54.36 K, cubic crystal structure, Pm3̅n (no. 223).
4. δ-phase: orange – forms at room temperature at a pressure of 9 GPa
5. ε-phase: dark-red to black – forms at room temperature at pressures greater than 10 GPa
6. ζ-phase: metallic – forms at pressures greater than 96 GPa

It has been found that oxygen is solidified into a state called the β-phase at room temperature by applying pressure, and with further increasing pressure, the β-phase undergoes phase transitions to the δ-phase at 9 GPa and the ε-phase at 10 GPa; and, due to the increase in molecular interactions, the color of the β-phase changes to pink, orange, then red (the stable octaoxygen phase), and the red color further darkens to black with increasing pressure. It was found that a metallic ζ-phase appears at 96 GPa when ε-phase oxygen is further compressed.

=== Red oxygen ===
As the pressure of oxygen at room temperature is increased through 10 gigapascals (1,500,000 psi), it undergoes a dramatic phase transition. Its volume decreases significantly and it changes color from sky-blue to deep red. However, this is a different allotrope of oxygen, O_{8}, not merely a different crystalline phase of O_{2}.

Ball-and-stick model of O_{8}	Part of the crystal structure of ε-oxygen

=== Metallic oxygen ===
A ζ-phase appears at 96 GPa when ε-phase oxygen is further compressed. This phase was discovered in 1990 by pressurizing oxygen to 132 GPa. The ζ-phase with metallic cluster exhibits superconductivity at pressures over 100 GPa and a temperature below 0.6 K.
