= Diazine =

Organic compound (C4H4N2); benzene with two CH groups replaced by N

In organic chemistry, diazines are a group of organic compounds having the molecular formula C_{4}H_{4}N_{2}. Each contains a benzene ring in which two of the C-H fragments have been replaced by isolobal nitrogen. There are three structural isomers:

- pyridazine (1,2-diazine)
- pyrimidine (1,3-diazine)
- pyrazine (1,4-diazine)

== See also ==
- 6-membered rings with one nitrogen atom: pyridines
- 6-membered rings with three nitrogen atoms: triazines
- 6-membered rings with four nitrogen atoms: tetrazines
- 6-membered rings with five nitrogen atoms: pentazines
- 6-membered rings with six nitrogen atoms: hexazines
