= Solid nitrogen =

Solid form of the 7th element

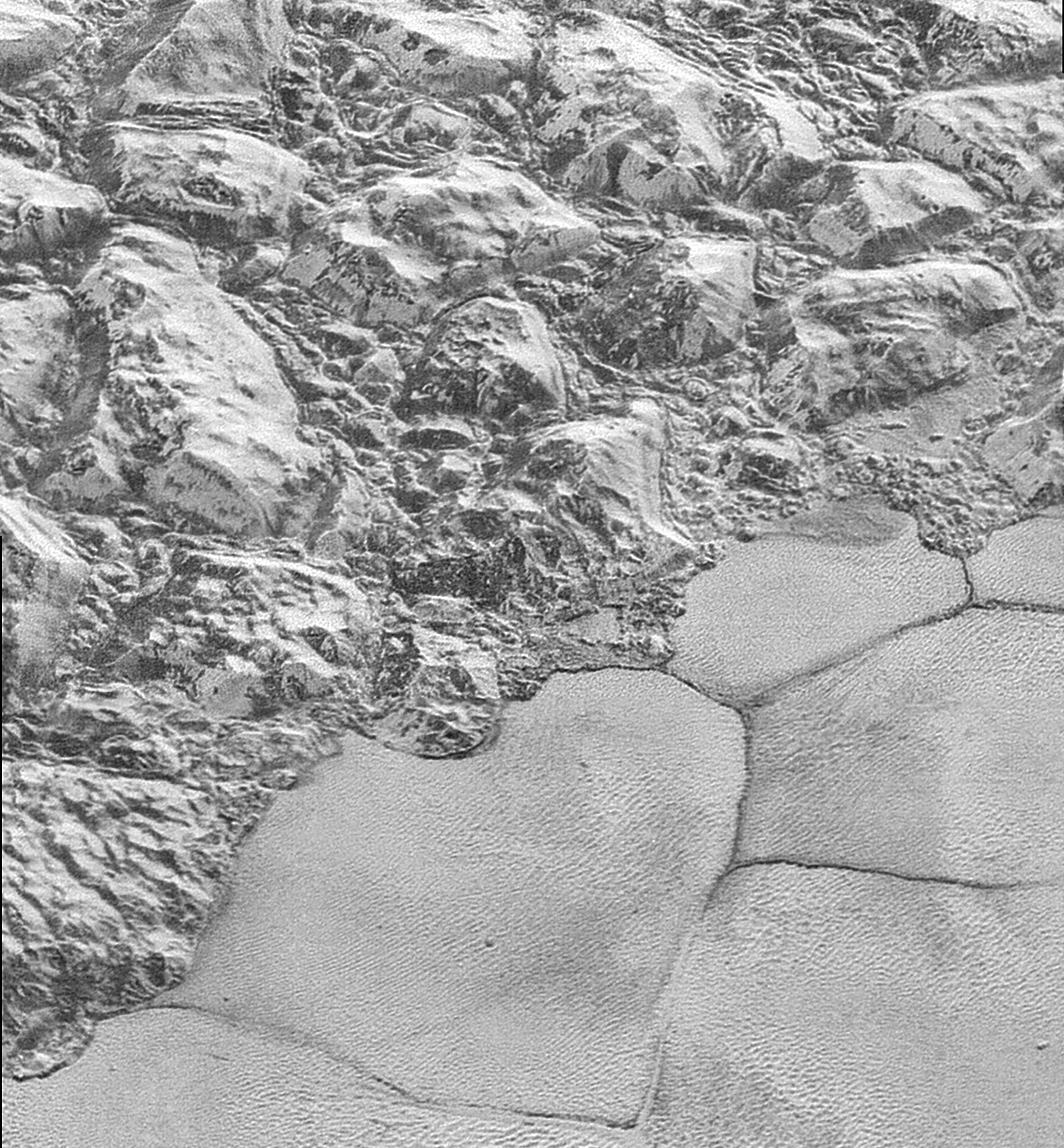
Solid nitrogen on the plains of Sputnik Planitia on Pluto next to water ice mountains.

Solid nitrogen is a number of solid forms of the element nitrogen, first observed in 1884. Solid nitrogen is mainly the subject of academic research, but low-temperature, low-pressure solid nitrogen is a substantial component of bodies in the outer Solar System and high-temperature, high-pressure solid nitrogen is a powerful explosive, with higher energy density than any other non-nuclear material.

== Generation ==
Karol Olszewski first observed solid nitrogen in 1884, by first liquefying hydrogen with evaporating liquid nitrogen, and then allowing the liquid hydrogen to freeze the nitrogen. By evaporating vapour from the solid nitrogen, Olszewski also generated the extremely low temperature of 48 K, at the time a world record.

Modern techniques usually take a similar approach: solid nitrogen is normally made in a laboratory by evaporating liquid nitrogen in a vacuum. The solid produced is porous.

== Occurrence in nature ==
Solid nitrogen forms a large part of the surface of Pluto (where it mixes with solid carbon monoxide and methane) and the Neptunian moon Triton. On Pluto it was directly observed for the first time in July 2015 by the New Horizons space probe and on Triton it was directly observed by the Voyager 2 space probe in August 1989.

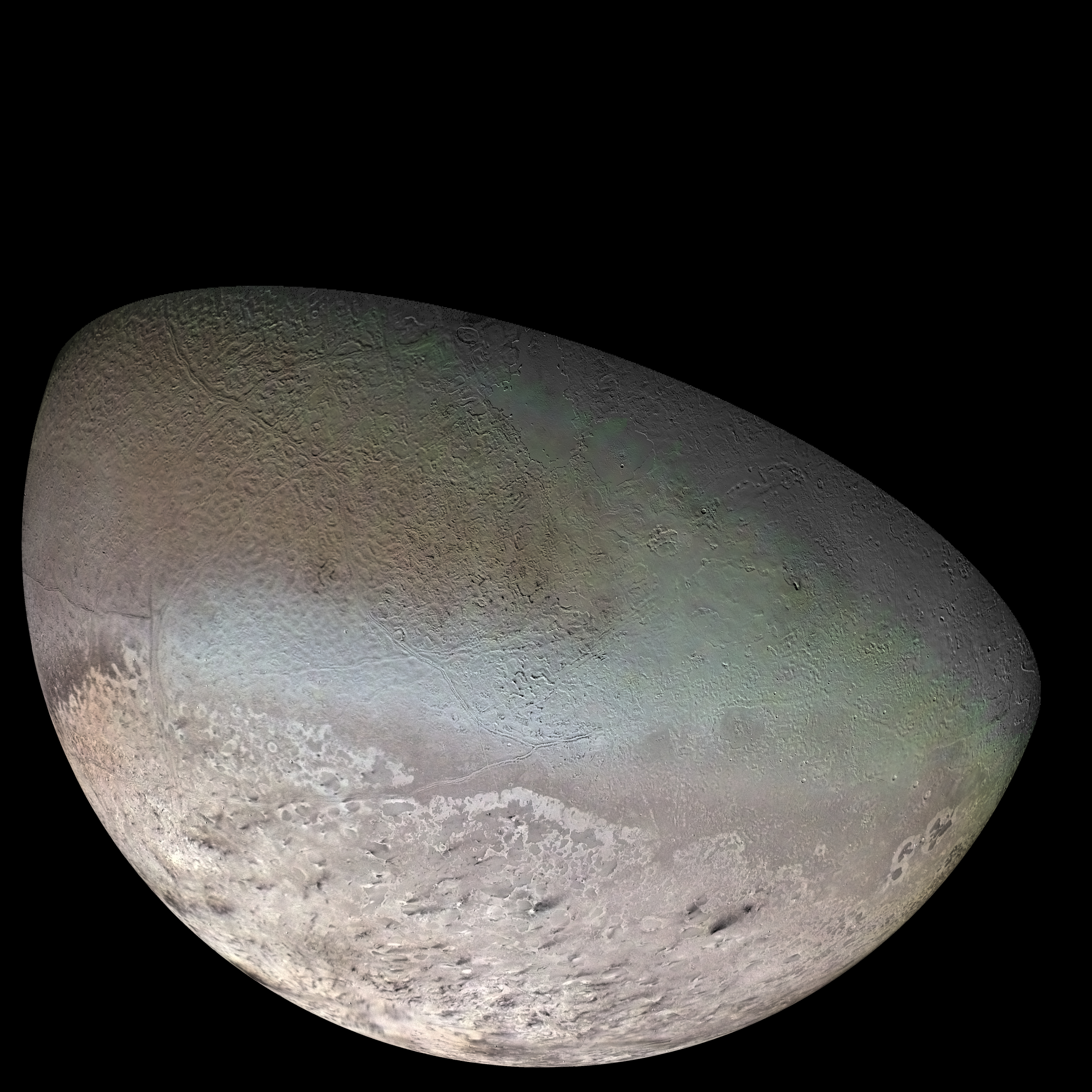
Much of the surface of Triton is covered in the hexagonal form of solid nitrogen (the β crystal phase), which can be seen as a bluish green band around the equator in this synthetic color photomosaic.

Even at the low temperatures of solid nitrogen it is fairly volatile and can sublime to form an atmosphere, or condense back into nitrogen frost. Compared to other materials, solid nitrogen loses cohesion at low pressures and flows in the form of glaciers when amassed. Yet its density is higher than that of water ice, so the forces of buoyancy will naturally transport blocks of water ice towards the surface. Indeed, New Horizons observed "floating" water ice atop nitrogen ice on the surface of Pluto.

On Triton, solid nitrogen takes the form of frost crystals and a transparent sheet layer of annealed nitrogen ice, often referred to as a "glaze". Eruptions of nitrogen gas were observed by Voyager 2 to spew from the subpolar regions around Triton's southern polar ice cap. A possible explanation of this observed phenomenon is that the Sun shines through the transparent layer of nitrogen ice, heating the layers beneath. Nitrogen sublimes and eventually erupts through holes in the upper layer, carrying dust along with it and creating dark streaks.

== Transitions to fluid allotropes ==
=== Melting ===
At standard atmospheric pressure, the melting point of N_{2} is 63.23 K.

Like most substances, nitrogen melts at a higher temperature with increasing ambient pressure until 50 GPa, when liquid nitrogen is predicted to polymerize. Within that region, melting point increases at a rate of approximately 190 K/GPa. Above 50 GPa, the melting point drops.

Observed melting points of N_{2}
Pressure (GPa)	Temperature (K)
2.8	308
4	368
7	484
50	1920
71	1400

=== Sublimation ===
Nitrogen has a triple point at 63.14±0.06 K and 0.1255±0.0005 bar; below this pressure, solid nitrogen sublimes directly to gas. At these low pressures, nitrogen exists in only two known allotropes: α-nitrogen (below 35 K) and β-nitrogen (35–63 K). Measurements of the vapour pressure from 20–63 K suggest the following empirical formulae:

$\ln{\left(\frac{P_{\text{subl}}}{1\text{ bar}}\right)}= 12.40- \frac{807.4\text{ K}}{T}- \frac{3926\text{ K}^2}{T^2}+ \frac{6.297\cdot 10^4\text{ K}^3}{T^3}- \frac{4.633\cdot10^5\text{ K}^4}{T^4}+ \frac{1.325\cdot10^6\text{ K}^5}{T^5} \quad\quad\quad(\alpha)$$\ln{\left(\frac{P_{\text{subl}}}{1\text{ bar}}\right)}= 8.514- \frac{458.4\text{ K}}{T}- \frac{19870\text{ K}^2}{T^2}+ \frac{4.800\cdot10^5\text{ K}^3}{T^3}- \frac{4.524\cdot10^6\text{ K}^4}{T^4} \quad\quad\quad(\beta)$

== Solubility in common cryogens ==
Solid nitrogen is slightly soluble in liquid hydrogen. Based on solubility in 60–75 K gaseous hydrogen, Seidal et al. estimated that liquid hydrogen at 15 K can dissolve (1–10)×10^{10} (molecule N_{2})/cm^{3}. At the boiling point of hydrogen with excess solid nitrogen, the dissolved molar fraction is 10^{−8}. At 15 atm and 32.5 K (just below the boiling point of H_{2} at this pressure), the maximum molar concentration of dissolved N_{2} is 7.0×10^{−6}. Nitrogen and oxygen are miscible in liquid phase but separate in solid phase. Thus excess nitrogen (melting at 63 K) or oxygen (melting at 55 K) freeze out first, and the eutectic liquid air freezes at 50 K.

== Crystal structure ==
=== Dinitrogen crystals ===
At ambient and moderate pressures, nitrogen forms N_{2} molecules; at low temperature London dispersion forces suffice to solidify these molecules.

==== α and β ====
Solid nitrogen admits two phases at ambient pressure: α- and β-nitrogen.

Below 35.6 K, nitrogen adopts a cubic structure with space group Pa3; the N_{2} molecules are located on the body diagonals of the unit cell cube. At low temperatures the α-phase can be compressed to 3500 atm before it changes (to γ), and as the temperature rises above 20 K, this pressure rises to about 4500 atm. At 21 K, the unit cell dimension is 5.667 Å, decreasing to 5.433 Å under 3785 bar.

Above 35.6 K (until it melts), nitrogen adopts a hexagonal close packed structure, with unit cell ratio c/a ≈ 1.633 = √8/3. The nitrogen molecules are randomly tipped at an angle of 55°, due to strong quadrupole-quadrupole interaction. At 45 K the unit cell has a = 4.050 Å and c = 6.604 Å, but these shrink at 4125 atm and 49 K to a = 3.861 Å and c = 6.265 Å. At higher pressures, the c/a displays practically no variation.

==== γ ====
The tetragonal γ form exists at low temperatures below 44.5 K and pressures around 0.3–3 GPa. The α/β/γ_{2} triple point occurs at 0.47 GPa and 44.5 K. Formation of γ-dinitrogen exhibits a substantial isotope effect: at 20 K, the isotope ^{15}N converts to the γ form at a pressure 400 atm (0.041 GPa) lower than natural nitrogen.

The space group of the γ phase is P4_{2}/mnm. At 20 K and 4000 bar, the unit cell has lattice constants a = 3.957 Å and c = 5.109 Å.

The nitrogen molecules themselves are arranged in P4_{2}/mnm pattern f (Note: Within the unit cell, atoms are located at positions (x,x,0), (-x,-x,0), (1/2+x,1/2-x,1/2), (1/2-x,1/2+x,1/2) where x = (molecular interatomic distance) / (√8a). This corresponds to molecules lined up in rows end to end diagonally on the ab plane. These rows stack side by side with molecules offset by half their length to form layers in the (001) plane, perpendicular to the c-axis. The layers then stack on top of each other, each rotated by 90° compared to the plane below.) and take the shape of a prolate spheroid with long dimension 4.34 Å and diameter 3.39 Å. (Note: Because of the uncertainty principle, the electron wavefunctions for N_{2} have infinite extent. The quoted dimensions correspond to an arbitrary cutoff at electron density 0.0135 (e^{−})/Å^{3}.) The molecules can vibrate up to 10° on the ab plane, and up to 15° in the direction of the c axis.

==== δ, δ_{loc}, and ε ====
At high pressure (but ambient temperature), dinitrogen adopts the cubic δ form, with space group pm3n and eight molecules per unit cell. This phase admits a lattice constant of 6.164 Å (at 300 K and 4.9 GPa). δ-N_{2} admits two triple points. The (δ-N_{2}, β-N_{2}, liquid) triple point occurs somewhere around 8–10 GPa and 555–578 K. The (δ-N_{2}, β-N_{2}, γ-N_{2}) triple point occurs at 2.3 GPa and 150 K.

Within the lattice cells, the molecules themselves have disordered orientation, but increases in pressure cause a phase transition to a slightly different phase, δ_{loc}, in which the molecular orientations progressively order, a distinction that is only visible via Raman spectroscopy. At high pressure (roughly 2–13 GPa) and low temperature, (Note: The ε-δ phase transition temperature varies substantially with pressure. At 2 GPa, the transition occurs around 50 K.) the dinitrogen molecule orientations fully order into the rhombohedral ε phase, which follows space group R3̅c. Cell dimensions are a = 8.02 Å, b = 8.02 Å, c = 11.104 Å, α = β = 90°, γ = 120°, volume 618.5 Å^{3}, Z = 24.

Dissolved He can stabilize ε-N_{2} at higher temperatures or lower pressures from transforming into δ-N_{2} (see § Related substances).

==== ζ ====
Above 60 GPa, ε-N_{2} transforms to a monoclinic phase designated by ζ-N_{2}. There is no measurable discontinuity in the volume per molecule between ε-N_{2} and ζ-N_{2}. The structure of ζ-N_{2} is very similar to that of ε-N_{2}, with only small differences in the orientation of the molecules. ζ-N_{2} adopts the monoclinic space group C2/c, and has lattice constants of a = 7.580 Å, b = 6.635 Å, c = 5.018 Å and β = 97.64° at 63 GPa with sixteen molecules per unit cell.

==== θ and ι ====
Further compression and heating produces two crystalline phases of nitrogen with surprising metastability.

A ζ-N_{2} phase compressed to 95 GPa and then heated to over 600 K produces a uniformly translucent structure called θ-nitrogen.

The ι phase can be accessed by isobarically heating ε-N_{2} to 750 K at 65 GPa or isothermal decompression of θ-N_{2} to 69 GPa at 850 K. The ι-N_{2} crystal structure is characterised by primitive monoclinic lattice with unit-cell dimensions of: a = 9.899(2) Å, b = 8.863(2) Å, c = 8.726(2) Å and β = 91.64(3)° at 56 GPa and ambient temperature. The space group is P2_{1}/c and the unit cell contains 48 N_{2} molecules arranged into a layered structure.

Upon pressure release, θ-N_{2} does not return to ε-N_{2} until around 30 GPa; ι-N_{2} transforms to ε-N_{2} when pressure drops below approximately 23 GPa.

==== "Black phosphorus" nitrogen ====
When compressing nitrogen to pressures of 120–180 GPa and temperatures above 4000 °C, nitrogen adopts a crystal structure ("bp-N") identical to that of black phosphorus (orthorhombic, Cmce space group). Like black phosphorus, bp-N is an electrical conductor. The existence of the bp-N structure matches the behavior of heavier pnictogens, and reaffirms the trend that elements at high pressure adopt the same structures as heavier congeners at lower pressures.

=== Oligomer crystals ===
==== Hexagonal layered polymeric nitrogen ====
Hexagonal layered polymeric nitrogen (HLP-N) was experimentally synthesized at 244 GPa and 3300 K. It adopts a tetragonal unit cell (P4_{2}bc) in which the single-bonded nitrogen atoms form two layers of interconnected N_{6} hexagons. HPL-N is metastable to at least 66 GPa.

==== Linear forms (N_{6} and N_{8}) ====
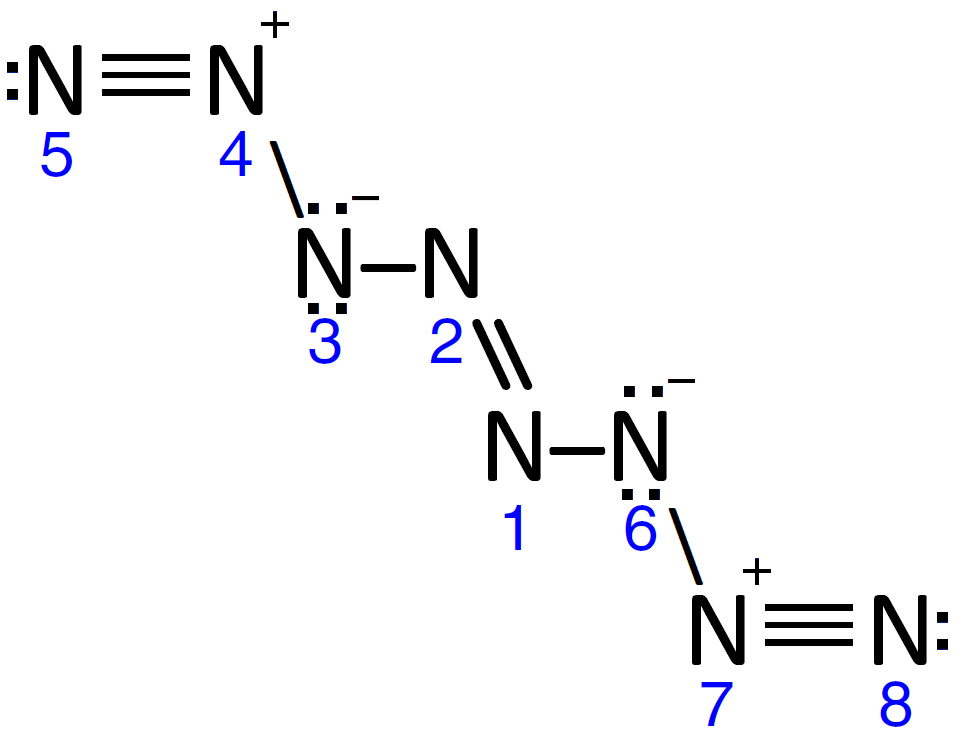
Predicted linear N_{8}, as its EEE' (all-trans) isomer

The decomposition of hydrazinium azide at high pressure and low temperature produces a molecular solid made of linear chains of 8 nitrogen atoms (N≡N^{+}−N^{−}−N=N−N^{−}−N^{+}≡N). Simulations suggest that N_{8} is stable at low temperatures and pressures (< 20 GPa); in practice, the reported N_{8} decomposes to the ε allotrope below 25 GPa, but a residue remains at pressures as low as 3 GPa.

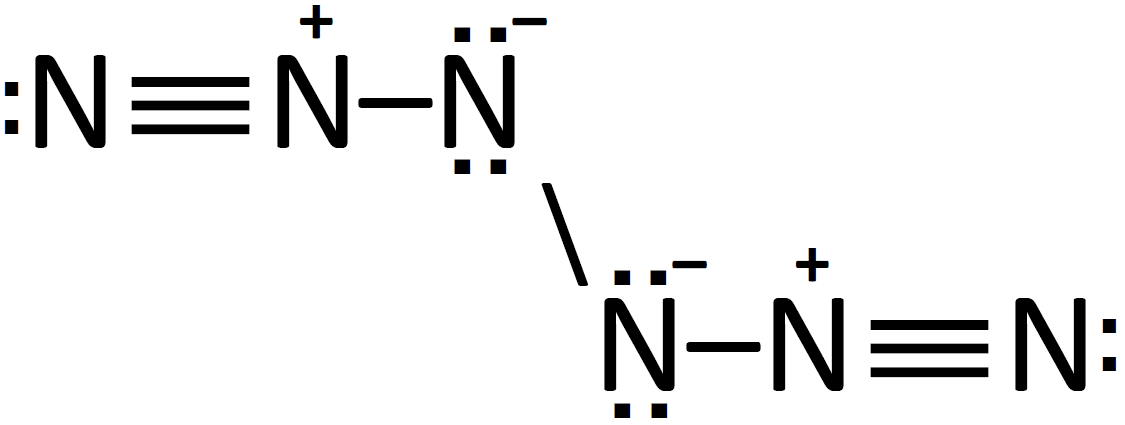
Linear N_{6} as predicted in 2016

Theoretical analyses in 2016 predicted that an analogous allotrope with six nitrogens should exist at ambient conditions. The synthesis of Hexanitrogen (C_{2h}-N_{6}) was published in 2025. It is highly stable at liquid nitrogen temperature (77 K (−321.1 °F; −196.2 °C)) and atmospheric pressure with a computed half-life of 132 years. It is fairly unstable at standard temperature and pressure, but still has a half-life (computed at 35.7 ms) long enough to allow it to be condensed from gas phase.

=== Amorphous and network allotropes ===
Non-molecular forms of solid nitrogen exhibit the highest known non-nuclear energy density.

==== μ ====
When the ζ-N_{2} phase is compressed at room temperature over 150 GPa an amorphous form is produced. This is a narrow gap semiconductor, and designated the μ-phase. The μ-phase has been brought to atmospheric pressure by first cooling it to 100 K.

==== η ====
η-N is a semiconducting amorphous form of nitrogen. It forms at pressures around 80–270 GPa and temperatures 10–510 K. In reflected light it appears black, but does transmit some red or yellow light. In the infrared there is an absorption band around 1700 cm^{−1}. Under even higher pressure of approximately 280 GPa, the band gap closes and η-nitrogen metallizes.

==== Cubic gauche ====
At pressures higher than 110 GPa and temperatures around 2000 K, nitrogen forms a network solid, bound by covalent bonds in a cubic-gauche structure, abbreviated as cg-N. The cubic-gauche form has space group I2_{1}3. Each unit cell has edge length 3.805 Å, and contains eight nitrogen atoms. As a network, cg-N consists of fused rings of nitrogen atoms; at each atom, the bond angles are very close to tetrahedral. The position of the lone pairs of electrons is ranged so that their overlap is minimised.

The cubic-gauche structure for nitrogen is predicted to have bond lengths of 1.40 Å, bond angles of 114.0° and dihedral angles of −106.8°. The term gauche refers to the odd dihedral angles, if it were 0° it would be called cis, and if 180° it would be called trans. The dihedral angle Φ is related to the bond angle θ by sec(Φ) = sec(θ) − 1. The coordinate of one atom in the unit cell at x,x,x also determines the bond angle by cos(θ) = x(x-1/4)/(x^{2}+(x-1/4)^{2}).

All bonds in cg-N have the same length: 1.346 Å at 115 GPa. This suggests that all bonds have the same order: a single bond carrying 4.94 eV/atom. In contrast, the triple bond in gaseous nitrogen carries only 0.83 eV/atom, so that relaxation to the gaseous form involves tremendous energy release: more than any other non-nuclear reaction. For this reason, cubic-gauche nitrogen is being investigated for use in explosives and rocket fuel. Estimates of its energy density vary: simulations predict 10–33 kJ/g is predicted, which is 160%–300% the energy density of HMX.

cg-N is also very stiff with a bulk modulus around 298 GPa, similar to diamond.

==== Poly-N ====
Another network solid nitrogen called poly-N and abbreviated pN was predicted in 2006. pN has space group C2/c and cell dimensions a = 5.49 Å, β = 87.68°. Other higher pressure polymeric forms are predicted in theory, and a metallic form is expected if the pressure is high enough.

=== Others ===
Yet other phases of solid dinitrogen are termed ζ'-N_{2} and κ-N_{2}.

== Bulk properties ==
At 58 K the ultimate compressive strength is 0.24 MPa. Strength increases as temperature lowers, becoming 0.54 MPa at 40.6 K. Elastic modulus varies from 161 to 225 MPa over the same range. This property is relevant in understanding the behaviour of nitrogen ice sheets and glaciers.

The thermal conductivity of solid nitrogen is 0.7 W m^{−1} K^{−1}. Thermal conductivity varies with temperature and the relation is given by k = 0.1802×T^{0.1041} W m^{−1} K^{−1}. Specific heat is given by 926.91×e^{0.0093T} joules per kilogram per kelvin. Its appearance at 50 K is transparent, while at 20 K it is white.

Nitrogen frost has a density of 0.85 g cm^{−3}. As a bulk material the crystals are pressed together and density is near that of water. It is temperature dependent and given by ρ = 0.0134T^{2} − 0.6981T + 1038.1 kg/m^{3}. The volume coefficient of expansion is given by 2×10^{−6}T^{2} − 0.0002T + 0.006 K^{−1}.

The index of refraction at 6328 Å is 1.25 and hardly varies with temperature.

The speed of sound in solid nitrogen is 1452 m/s at 20 K and 1222 m/s at 44 K. The longitudinal velocity ranges from 1850 m/s at 5 K to 1700 m/s at 35 K. With temperature rise the nitrogen changes phase and the longitudinal velocity drops rapidly over a small temperature range to below 1600 m/s and then it slowly drops to 1400 m/s near the melting point. The transverse velocity is much lower ranging from 900 to 800 m/s over the same temperature range.

The bulk modulus of s-N_{2} is 2.16 GPa at 20 K, and 1.47 GPa at 44 K. At temperatures below 30 K solid nitrogen will undergo brittle failure, particularly if strain is applied quickly. Above this temperature the failure mode is ductile failure. Dropping 10 K makes the solid nitrogen 10 times as stiff.

== Related substances ==
Under pressure nitrogen can form crystalline van der Waals compounds with other molecules. It can form an orthorhombic phase with methane above 5 GPa. With helium, He(N_{2})_{11} is formed. N_{2} crystallizes with water in nitrogen clathrate and in a mixture with oxygen O_{2} and water in air clathrate.

=== Helium ===
Solid nitrogen can dissolve 2 mole % helium under pressure in its disordered phases, such as the γ-phase. Under higher pressure, 9 mol% helium can react with ε-nitrogen to form a hexagonal birefringent crystalline van der Waals compound. The unit cell contains 22 nitrogen atoms and 2 helium atoms. It has a volume of 580 Å^{3} for a pressure of 11 GPa decreasing to 515 Å^{3} at 14 GPa. It resembles the ε-phase. At 14.5 GPa and 295 K the unit cell has space group P6_{3}/m and a=7.936 Å c=9.360 Å. At 28 GPa a transition happens in which the orientation of N_{2} molecules becomes more ordered. When the pressure on He(N_{2})_{11} exceeds 135 GPa the substance changes from clear to black, and takes on an amorphous form similar to η-N_{2}.

=== Methane ===
Solid nitrogen can crystallise with some solid methane (CH_{4}) included. At 55 K the molar percentage can range up to 16.35% CH_{4}, and at 40 K only 5%. In the complementary situation, solid methane can include some nitrogen in its crystals, up to 17.31% nitrogen. As the temperature drops, less methane can dissolve in solid nitrogen, and in α-N_{2} there is a major drop in methane solubility. These mixtures are prevalent in outer Solar System objects such as Pluto that have both nitrogen and methane on their surfaces. At room temperature there is a clathrate of methane and nitrogen in 1:1 ratio formed at pressures over 5.6 GPa.

=== Carbon monoxide ===
The carbon monoxide molecule (CO) is very similar to dinitrogen in size, and it can mix in all proportions with solid nitrogen without changing crystal structure. Carbon monoxide is also found on the surfaces of Pluto and Triton at levels below 1%. Variations in the infrared linewidth of carbon monoxide absorption can reveal the concentration.

=== Noble gases ===
Neon or xenon atoms can also be included in solid nitrogen in the β and δ phases. Inclusion of neon pushes the β−δ phase boundary to higher pressures. Argon is also very miscible in solid nitrogen. For compositions of argon and nitrogen with 60% to 70% nitrogen, the hexagonal form remains stable to 0 K. A van der Waals compound of xenon and nitrogen exists above 5.3 GPa. A van der Waals compound of neon and nitrogen was shown using Raman spectroscopy. The compound has formula (N_{2})_{6}Ne_{7}. It has a hexagonal structure, with a=14.400 c=8.0940 at a pressure of 8 GPa. A van der Waals compound with argon is not known.

=== Hydrogen ===
With dideuterium, a clathrate (N_{2})_{12}D_{2} exists around 70 GPa.

=== Oxygen ===
Solid nitrogen can take up to a one fifth substitution by oxygen O_{2} and still keep the same crystal structure. δ-N_{2} can be substituted by up to 95% O_{2} and retain the same structure. Solid O_{2} can only have a solid solution of 5% or less of N_{2}.

== Use ==
Solid nitrogen is used in a slush mixture with liquid nitrogen in order to cool faster than with liquid nitrogen alone, useful for applications such as sperm cryopreservation. The semi-solid mixture can also be called slush nitrogen or SN2.

Solid nitrogen is used as a matrix on which to store and study reactive chemical species, such as free radicals or isolated atoms. One use is to study dinitrogen complexes of metals in isolation from other molecules.

== Reactions ==
When solid nitrogen is irradiated by high speed protons or electrons, several reactive radicals are formed, including atomic nitrogen (N), nitrogen cations (N^{+}), dinitrogen cation (N_{2}^{+}), trinitrogen radicals (N_{3} and N_{3}^{+}), and azide (N_{3}^{−}).
