= Pyridazine =

Heterocyclic organic compound (C4H4N2)

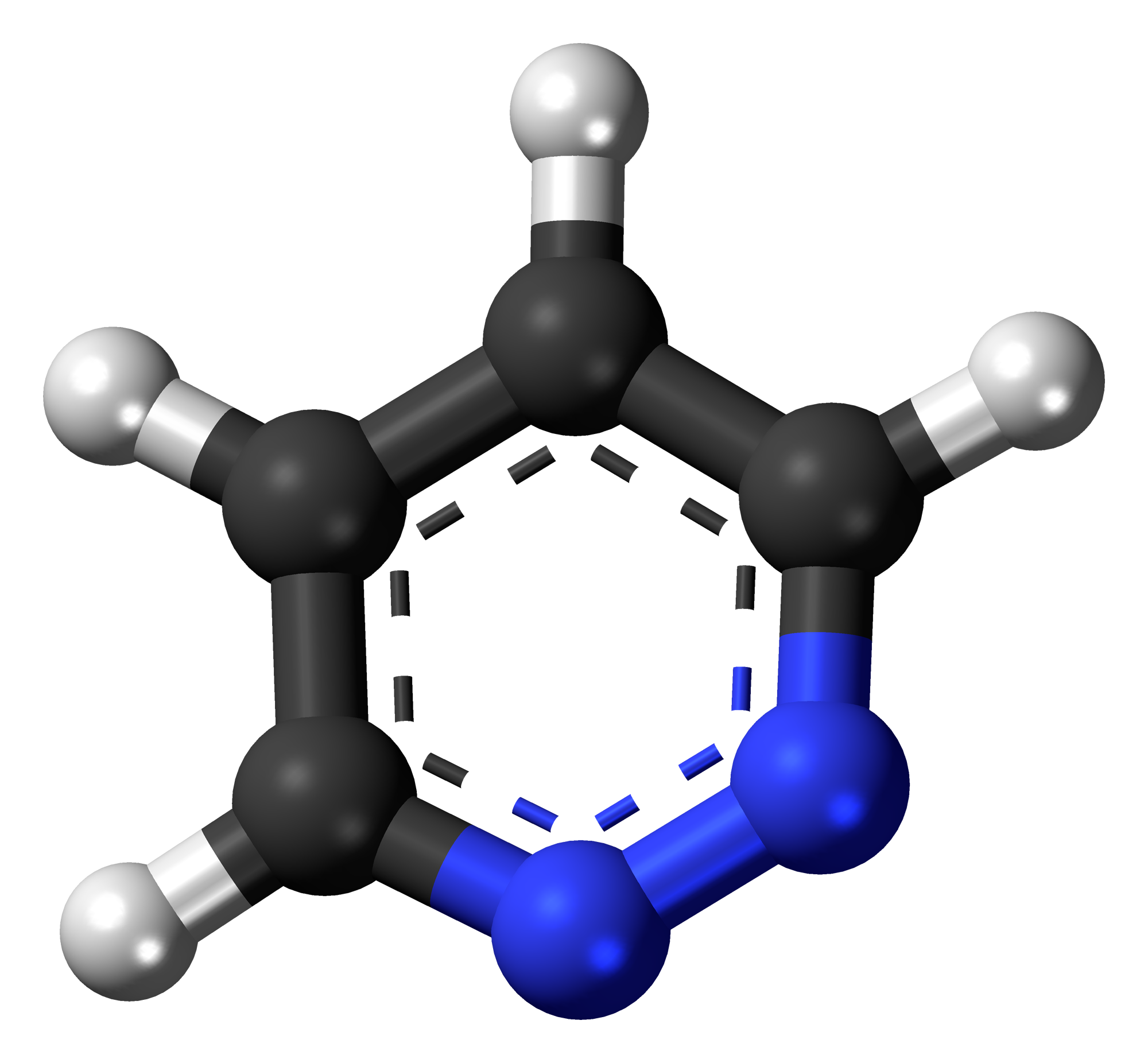
C=black, H=white, N=blue
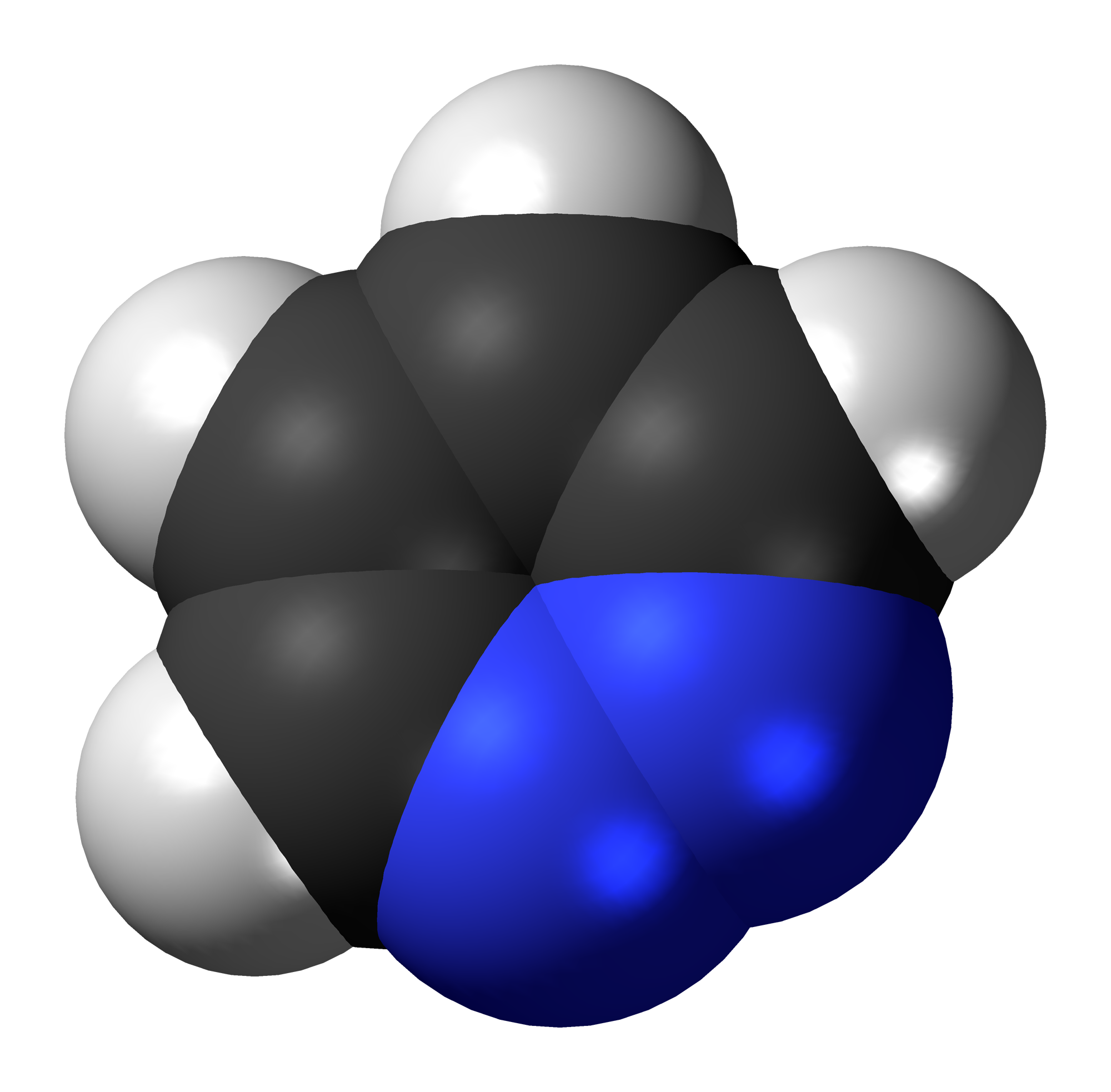
C=black, H=white, N=blue

Names
- Preferred IUPAC name Pyridazine
- Systematic IUPAC name 1,2-Diazabenzene
- Other names 1,2-Diazine; Orthodiazine; Oizine

Identifiers
CAS Number	289-80-5
3D model (JSmol)	Interactive image
Beilstein Reference	103906
ChEBI	CHEBI:30954
ChEMBL	ChEMBL15719
ChemSpider	8902
ECHA InfoCard	100.005.478
EC Number	206-025-5
Gmelin Reference	49310
PubChem CID	9259
UNII	449GLA0653
CompTox Dashboard (EPA)	DTXSID7059777
- InChI: InChI=1S/C4H4N2/c1-2-4-6-5-3-1/h1-4H Key: PBMFSQRYOILNGV-UHFFFAOYSA-N; InChI=1/C4H4N2/c1-2-4-6-5-3-1/h1-4H Key: PBMFSQRYOILNGV-UHFFFAOYAA
- SMILES: n1ncccc1

Properties
Chemical formula	C_{4}H_{4}N_{2}
Molar mass	80.090 g·mol^{−1}
Appearance	Colorless liquid
Density	1.107 g/cm^{3}
Melting point	−8 °C (18 °F; 265 K)
Boiling point	208 °C (406 °F; 481 K)
Solubility in water	miscible
Solubility	miscible in dioxane, ethanol soluble in benzene, diethyl ether negligible in cyclohexane, ligroin
Refractive index (n_{D})	1.52311 (23.5 °C)

Thermochemistry
Std enthalpy of formation (Δ_{f}H^{⦵}_{298})	224.9 kJ/mol

Hazards
- GHS labelling
Pictograms	(GHS07: Exclamation mark)
Signal word	Warning
Hazard statements	H302, H315, H319, H335
Precautionary statements	P261, P264, P264+P265, P270, P271, P280, P301+P317, P302+P352, P304+P340, P305+P351+P338, P319, P321, P330, P332+P317, P337+P317, P362+P364, P403+P233, P405, P501
Flash point	85 °C (185 °F; 358 K)

Related compounds
Related compounds	pyridine; pyrimidine; pyrazine
- Except where otherwise noted, data are given for materials in their standard state (at 25 °C [77 °F], 100 kPa). verify (what is ?) Infobox references

Pyridazine is an aromatic, heterocyclic, organic compound with the molecular formula C_{4}H_{4}N_{2}. It contains a six-membered ring with two adjacent nitrogen atoms. It is a colorless liquid with a boiling point of 208 °C. It is isomeric with two other diazine (C_{4}H_{4}N_{2}) rings, pyrimidine and pyrazine.

== Occurrence ==
Pyridazines are rare in nature, possibly reflecting the scarcity of naturally occurring hydrazines, common building blocks for the synthesis of these heterocycles. The pyridazine structure is a popular pharmacophore which is found within a number of herbicides such as credazine, pyridafol and pyridate. It is also found within the structure of several drugs such as cefozopran, cadralazine, minaprine, pipofezine, and hydralazine.

== Synthesis ==
In the course of his classic investigation on the Fischer indole synthesis, Emil Fischer prepared the first pyridazine via the condensation of phenylhydrazine and levulinic acid. The parent heterocycle was first prepared by oxidation of benzocinnoline to the pyridazinetetracarboxylic acid followed by decarboxylation. A better route to this otherwise esoteric compound starts with the maleic hydrazide. These heterocycles are often prepared via condensation of 1,4-diketones or 4-ketoacids with hydrazines.
