= Trinitrogen =

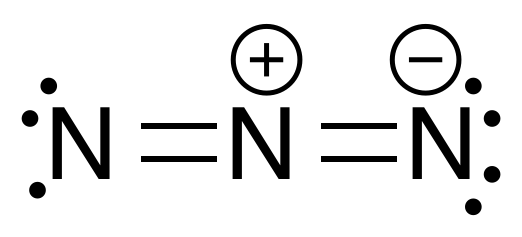

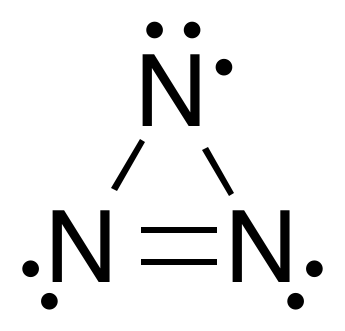

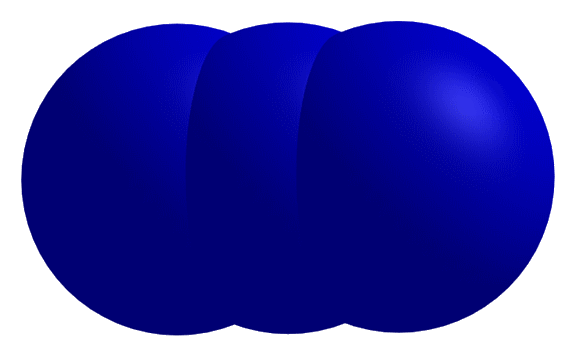

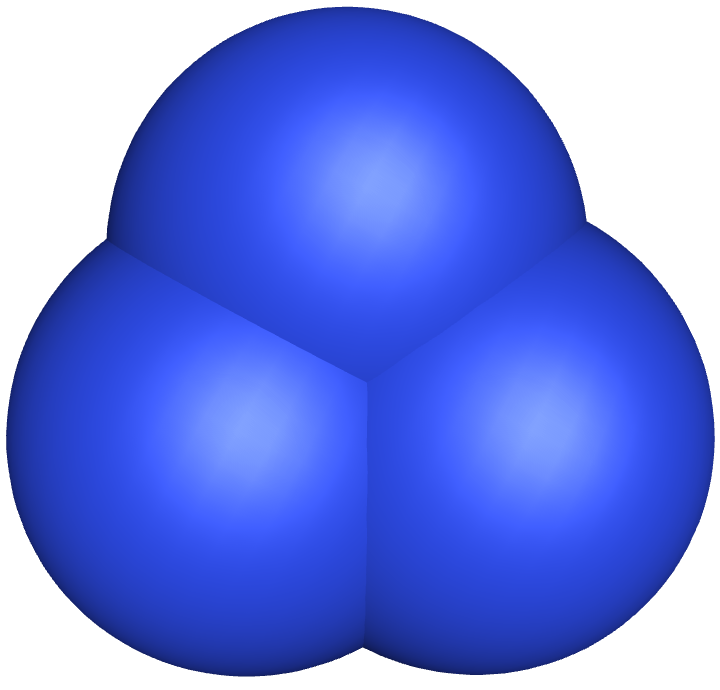

Names
- Other names Azide radical Triazirene (cyclic) Triazadienyl

Identifiers
CAS Number	linear: 12596-60-0
3D model (JSmol)	linear: Interactive image; cyclic: Interactive image
ChEBI	linear: CHEBI:29448
ChemSpider	linear: 5256999
Gmelin Reference	770
PubChem CID	linear: 6857664; cyclic: 71328875
CompTox Dashboard (EPA)	linear: DTXSID801315735
- InChI: InChI=1S/N3/c1-3-2 Key: DUAJIKVIRGATIW-UHFFFAOYSA-N; cyclic: InChI=1S/N3/c1-2-3-1 Key: RLXSTAGCZQYHDL-UHFFFAOYSA-N
- SMILES: linear: [N-]=[N+]=[N]; cyclic: N1=N[N]1

Properties
Chemical formula	N_{3}
Molar mass	42.021 g·mol^{−1}
- Except where otherwise noted, data are given for materials in their standard state (at 25 °C [77 °F], 100 kPa). Infobox references

Trinitrogen, also known as the azide radical, is an unstable molecule composed of three nitrogen atoms. Two arrangements are known: a linear form with double bonds and charge transfer, and a cyclic form. Both forms are highly unstable, though the linear form is the more stable of the two. More-stable derivatives exist, such as when it acts as a ligand, and it may participate in azido nitration, which is a reaction between sodium azide and ammonium cerium nitrate.

The linear form of N_{3} is similar to the azide anion and was discovered in 1956 by B. A. Thrush by photolysis of hydrogen azide. As a linear and symmetric molecule, it has D_{∞h} symmetry, with a nitrogen–nitrogen bond length averaging 1.8115 Å. The first excited electronic state, A^{2}Σ_{u}, is 4.56 eV above the ground state.

The cyclic form was identified in 2003 by N. Hansen and A. M. Wodtke using ultraviolet photolysis of chlorine azide. Although the reaction yielded mostly the linear form, about 20% of the molecules were cyclic. The ring has C_{2v} symmetry—an isosceles triangle—in contrast to the linear form that has equal N–N bond-lengths.
