= Guanamine =

Organic compound (H2NC)2N3CR; heterocycles of the triazine class

Structure of guanamines, R = alkyl, aryl, etc.

In organic chemistry, a guanamine is an organic compound with the formula (H_{2}NC)_{2}N_{3}CR. They are heterocycles of the triazine class. Guanamines are closely related to melamine ((H_{2}NC)_{3}N_{3}), except with one amino substituent replaced by an organic group. With two amines, guanamines are bifunctional, whereas melamine is trifunctional. This difference is exploited in the use of guanamines to modify the crosslink density in melamine resins. They are white or colorless solids of low toxicity.

Some popular guanamines are the phenyl, methyl and nonyl derivatives, called benzoguanamine, acetoguanamine, and capriguanamine. They are all prepared by the condensation of cyanoguanidine with the corresponding nitrile:

(H_{2}N)_{2}C=NCN + RCN → (CNH_{2})_{2}(CR)N_{3}
