= Benzyl butyl phthalate =

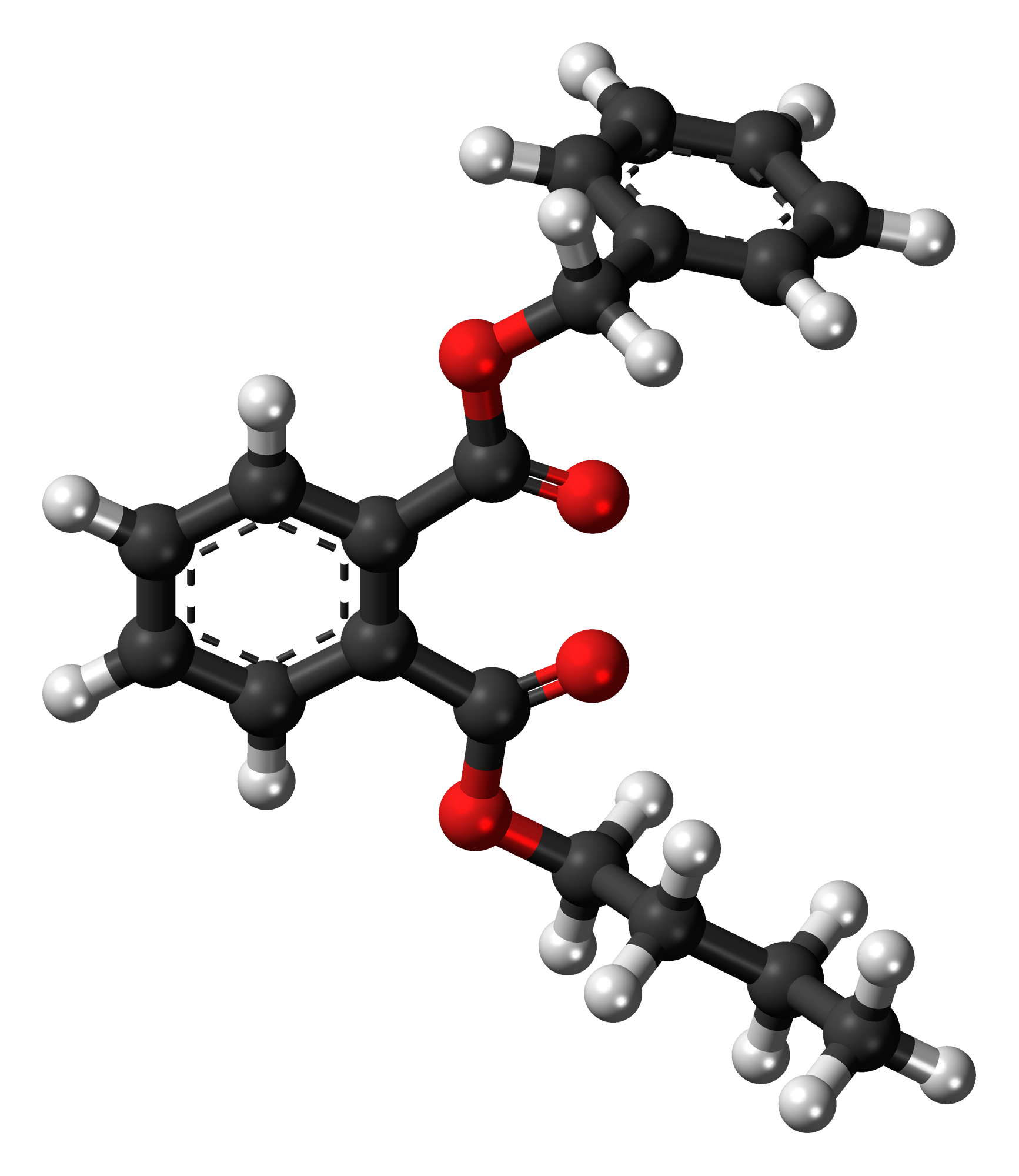

Names
- Preferred IUPAC name Benzyl butyl benzene-1,2-dicarboxylate
- Other names Benzylbutylphthalate; n-Butyl benzyl phthalate; BBP

Identifiers
CAS Number	85-68-7
3D model (JSmol)	Interactive image
ChEBI	CHEBI:34595
ChEMBL	ChEMBL1450327
ChemSpider	2257
ECHA InfoCard	100.001.475
EC Number	201-622-7
KEGG	C14211
PubChem CID	2347
RTECS number	TH9990000
UNII	YPC4PJX59M
UN number	3082
CompTox Dashboard (EPA)	DTXSID3020205
- InChI: InChI=1S/C19H20O4/c1-2-3-13-22-18(20)16-11-7-8-12-17(16)19(21)23-14-15-9-5-4-6-10-15/h4-12H,2-3,13-14H2,1H3 Key: IRIAEXORFWYRCZ-UHFFFAOYSA-N; InChI=1/C19H20O4/c1-2-3-13-22-18(20)16-11-7-8-12-17(16)19(21)23-14-15-9-5-4-6-10-15/h4-12H,2-3,13-14H2,1H3 Key: IRIAEXORFWYRCZ-UHFFFAOYAR
- SMILES: CCCCOC(=O)c1ccccc1C(=O)OCc2ccccc2

Properties
Chemical formula	C_{19}H_{20}O_{4}
Molar mass	312.365 g·mol^{−1}
Density	1.119 g cm^{−3}
Melting point	−35 °C (−31 °F; 238 K)
Boiling point	370 °C (698 °F; 643 K)

Hazards
- GHS labelling
Pictograms	(GHS08: Health hazard) (GHS09: Environmental hazard)
Signal word	Danger
Hazard statements	H360, H410
Precautionary statements	P201, P202, P273, P281, P308+P313, P391, P405, P501
- Except where otherwise noted, data are given for materials in their standard state (at 25 °C [77 °F], 100 kPa). verify (what is ?) Infobox references

Benzyl butyl phthalate (BBP) is an organic compound historically used as a plasticizer, which has now been largely phased out due to health concerns. It is a phthalate ester of containing benzyl alcohol, and n-butanol tail groups. Like most phthalates, BBP is non-volatile and remains liquid over a wide range of temperatures. It was mostly used as a plasticizer for PVC, but was also a common plasticizer for PVCA and PVB.

BBP was commonly used as a plasticizer for vinyl foams, which are often used as sheet vinyl flooring and tiles. Compared to other phthalates it was less volatile than dibutyl phthalate and imparted better low temperature flexibility than di(2-ethylhexyl) phthalate.

BBP is classified as toxic by the European Chemical Bureau (ECB) and hence its use in Europe has declined rapidly.

== Structure and reactivity ==
BBP is a diester. Since BBP contains two ester bonds it can react in a variety of chemical pathways. Both the carbonyl C-atoms are weakly electrophilic and therefore targets for attacks by strong nucleophilic compounds. Besides the carbonyl C-atom target, it contains a C-H bond whereas the H-atom is weakly acidic, which makes it susceptible for deprotonation by a strong base. BBP is hydrolyzed under either acidic or basic conditions. The hydrolysis under acidic conditions is a reversion of the Fischer-Speier esterification, whereas the hydrolysis under basic conditions is performed by saponification. Since BBP contains two ester bonds it is difficult to perform a chemoselective reaction.

Under basic conditions BBP can undergo saponification. The saponification number of BBP is 360 mg KOH/g. The amount of carboxylic functional groups per molecule are relatively high (2 carboxylic functional groups with a molecular weight of 312.36). This makes the compound relatively unsaponifiable.

== Synthesis ==
Concentrated sulfuric acid dehydrates n-butyl alcohol to yield 1-butene, which reacts with phthalic anhydride to produce n-butyl phthalate. Phthalic anhydride does react directly with 1-butanol to form this same intermediate, but further reaction to form dibutyl phthalate does occur to a significant extent. Carrying out the procedure using 1-butene avoids this side reaction. Monobutyl phthalate is isolated and then added to a mixture of benzyl bromide in acetone in the presence of potassium carbonate (to keep the pH high to facilitate the substitution reaction required to form the second ester linkage), from which BBP can then be isolated.

== Metabolism ==
BBP can be absorbed by the human body in a variety of ways. First of all, it can be taken up dermally, meaning that the compound is absorbed by the skin. Studies in rats show that 27% of the uptake of BBP occurs via this route. During this process, the structure of the phthalate diester determines the degree of dermal absorption.

BBP can also be taken up orally. The amount of the compound that is being absorbed by the body depends on the dose that has been administered. Absorption seems to be limited at high doses, meaning that small amounts are taken up more easily than great amounts. Finally, BBP can be inhaled. In this case, BBP is absorbed via the lungs.

BBP is biotransformed in the human body in numerous of ways. Gut esterases metabolize BBP to monoester metabolites. Those are mainly monobutyl and mono-benzyl phthalate (MBzP) plus small amounts of mono-n-butyl phthalate. The ratio of monobutyl to monobenzyl phthalate has been determined to be 5:3. These metabolites can be absorbed and excreted directly or undergo a phase II reaction. In the latter, they are conjugated with glucuronic acid and then excreted as glucuronate. Studies in rats have shown that 70% of BBP is not conjugated while 30% is conjugated. At high concentrations of BBP, relatively less metabolite is conjugated. This indicates that the conjugation pathway (glucuronidation) is saturated at high amounts of administered BBP. The metabolites of BBP are excreted rapidly, 90% of them has left the body within 24 hours. As a consequence, the half-life of BBP in the blood is quite low and counts up to only 10 minutes. However, monoester metabolites of BBP (such as monophthalate) have a longer half-life of 6 hours.

BBP is metabolized quite efficiently within the body. While a major part of the BBP is excreted as a mono-benzyl phthalate metabolite, a minor fragment of the BBP is excreted in the form of mono-butyl phthalate. BBP is rarely found in the bile in its original form. Nevertheless, metabolites like monobutyl glucuronide and monobenzyl phthalate glucuronide as well as trace amounts of free monoesters can be found there.

== Mode of action ==
Relatively little is known about the modes of action of BBP. Experimental research does hint at a number of mechanisms, though. One phenomenon is that BBP binds to the estrogen receptor of rats. In vitro-experiments do show a weak potential of BBP to have an influence on estrogen-mediated gene expression. This is because phthalates like BBP are mimicking estrogens. Metabolites of BBP, on the other hand, are only weakly reactive with the estrogen receptor. Not much is known about if and how this mechanism plays out in vivo.

Furthermore, BBP binds to intracellular steroid receptors and causes genomic effects by doing so. BBP also interferes with ion-channel receptors which cause non-genomic effects. The underlying mechanism is that BBP blocks the calcium signaling that is coupled with P2X receptors. Calcium signaling, mediated via P2X, eventually has an influence in cell proliferation and bone remodeling. During developmental phases of bone remodelling, high environmental exposure of BBP might therefore pose a problem.

== Exposure ==
The exposure of the general population to BBP has been estimated by several authorities. One of the authorities, the International Program on Chemical Safety (IPCS), came to the conclusion that exposure to BBP is mainly caused by food intake. BBP, as many other phthalates, is used to increase the flexibility of plastics. However, phthalates are not bound to the plastics which means that they can easily be released into the environment. From there it can be taken up into food during crop cultivation. Alternatively, BBP can enter food via food packaging materials. Moreover, children may be exposed to BBP by mouthing of toys. Various studies by authorities, between the 1980s and 2000s, have been done to estimate the general population exposure to BBP in different countries with varying results. The adult exposure was estimated to be 2 μg/kg body weight/day in the U.S. BBP exposure to children is likely to be higher due to differences in food intake. Nonetheless, these estimates should be interpreted with caution as they are based on different food types, different assumptions were used in calculations, levels of BBP in food vary in different countries and levels of BBP in food changes over time. Next to general exposure there is also occupation-related exposure to BBP . This can occur via inhalation of vapors or via skin contact. This has been estimated to be 286 μg/kg body weight/day. However, in general the occupational exposure is thought be lower than this. The NOAEL of BBP was experimentally found to be 50 mg/kg body weight/day and the associated margin of safety is ca. 4,800 or more. Thus, BBP does not seem to pose a very high risk under conditions of general or occupational exposure based on current estimates.

== Toxicity and adverse effects ==
No primary irritation or sensitization reactions were found in a patch test involving 200 volunteers. However, if BBP is taken up by the body it can exert toxic effects. It has a LD50 for rats ranging from 2 to 20 g/kg body weight.

=== Occupational hazards ===
Workers in the PVC processing industry are exposed to higher levels of BBP than the general public and are thus more at risk of experiencing negative health effects. No effects of the respiratory or peripheral nerve system have been observed in workers. Although slightly higher levels of BBP metabolites were found in their urine. Long-term occupational exposure to BBP does, however, significantly increase the risk of multiple myeloma.

=== Children ===
Children are possibly exposed to higher levels of BBP than adults. Since children form a vulnerable group for chemical exposure, studies have been conducted to evaluate the effects of BBP exposure. PVC flooring has been linked to a significant increase in the risk of bronchial obstruction in the first two years of life and in the development of language delay in pre-school aged children. BBP has also been positively associated with airway inflammation in children living in urban areas. Moreover, there is evidence suggesting that prenatal exposure to BBP coming from in house dust affects the risk of childhood eczema. The exact mechanism of how phthalates and their metabolites reach the fetus remain unclear. However, since these chemicals seem to be able to reach the fetus they are thought to affect fetal health and development. Further research is needed to establish the effect of prenatal exposure on fetal development.

=== Teratogenicity and reproductive effects ===
Only a few studies have been done on reproductive effects of BBP on humans, but the results are inconclusive. According to the NTP-CERHR the adverse reproductive effects are negligible for exposed men. Yet, one study found a link between altered semen quality and exposure to monobutyl phthalate, a major metabolite of BBP. No research has been done on the teratogenic effects of BBP on humans. However, numerous studies have been conducted with animals. Prenatal exposure to high levels of BBP in rats can lead to lower fetal body weight, increased incidence of fetal malformations, post-implantation loss and even embryonic death. The precise teratogenic effects observed in rat fetuses seem to be related to the period of exposure in development. Exposure to BBP in the first half of pregnancy lead to embryolethality while exposure in the second half to teratogenicity.

In a two-generational study male offspring were found to have macroscopic and microscopic changes in the testes, decreased serum testosterone concentrations in addition to reduced sperm production. Additionally, reduced seminal vesicle weight has been observed. These results indicate a clear negative effect on the fertility.

=== Other toxicity studies in animals ===
Numerous studies have been carried out in animals to elucidate the adverse effects of BBP exposure. Long-term BBP exposure in rats leads to reduced body weight, increased weight of the liver and kidneys and carcinogenicity. In male rats the incidence of pancreatic tumors increased while in female rats the incidence for both pancreatic and bladder tumors increased. Although BBP has been linked to carcinogenicity, studies indicate that BBP is not genotoxic.

== Environmental toxicology ==
BBP, like other low molecular weight phthalate esters, is toxic to aquatic organisms. This includes unicellular freshwater green algae such as Selenastrum capricornutum. BBP has also been shown to be toxic to freshwater invertebrates like D. magna. For these organisms, the toxic effect correlates with the water solubility of the phthalate which is relatively high for BBP compared to high molecular weight phthalates. BBP affects saltwater invertebrates significantly. Experiments with mysid shrimp show that BBP is acutely toxic to these organisms. Among the species of fish, the sweetwater fish bluegills were shown to be toxically affected by BBP. Furthermore, a rapid lethal effect has been observed for the saltwater fish Parophrys vetulus.

== Degradation ==
When the degradation of BBP is taken into consideration, one should be aware of the fact that it contains two ester functional groups. This gives organisms a handle for biotransformations. The ester groups gives BBP hydrophilic properties and will therefore hydrolyze fairly easy. Following an examination performed in 1997, it was found that biotransformations play a very important role in the degeneration of BBP. Furthermore, the solubility in water plays a significant role in the effectiveness of biotransformation in an environment. The butyl group gives BBP a slightly more hydrophobic property, compared to other plasticizer it is relatively good soluble. The longer the alkyl chain the less soluble and the less well it is degenerated.

== Legislation measures ==
BBP was listed as a developmental toxicant under California's Proposition 65 on December 2, 2005. California's Office of Environmental Health Hazard Assessment (OEHHA), on July 1, 2013, approved a Maximum Allowable Dose Level of 1,200 micrograms per day for BBP. Canadian Authorities have restricted the usage of phthalates, including BBP, in soft vinyl children's toys and child care articles.

According to EU Council Directive 67/548/EEC1, BBP is classified as reproductive toxicant and therefore restricted in use. The restriction covers the placing on the market and use in any type of toys and childcare articles. These restrictions are in place since 16 January 2017. Due to the classification and labelling of BBP companies have moved to the use of alternatives. Restrictions are not limited to toys. Since 22 November 2006 cosmetic products containing BBP shall not be supplied to consumers in the EU.
