= Tapi Carpets =

British retailer specialising in carpets and floors

Tapi Carpets & Floors Limited
- Industry: Retail
- Founded: 2015; 11 years ago
- Headquarters: Orpington, Greater London, England
- Number of locations: 227 stores including 20 John Lewis concessions
- Key people: William Barker, Executive Chairman Jeevan Karir, CEO Lord Harris of Peckham, Honorary President
- Subsidiaries: Carpetright
- Website: www.tapi.co.uk

Tapi Carpets and Floors store in Norwich, England

Tapi Carpets & Floors Limited (trading as Tapi Carpets and Tapi) is a British retailer based in Orpington which specialises in carpets and floors.

== Outlets ==
In November 2016, Tapi opened its first Central London store on Tottenham Court Road.

Tapi has over 210 stores around mainland UK. As of July 2024, it acquired an additional 54 stores from Carpetright. In addition to its stores, Tapi has mobile showrooms that bring flooring samples of carpets, laminate flooring, vinyl flooring and engineered wood flooring to customers’ homes.

On 16 January 2025, John Lewis & Partners announced that Tapi flooring concessions would be launched in 17 of their stores by the summer of 2025, with the first one opening at their Oxford Street flagship store on 10 February 2025.

== Ownership ==
Tapi Carpets & Floors was founded in 2015 by a handful of flooring specialists and the Harris Family (who previously owned Carpetright).The first store opened in May 2015 in Tooting (which was formerly a Carpetright) .

On 22 July 2024, Tapi Carpets & Floors bought Carpetright in a pre-packaged insolvency deal gaining the Harris Family control of Carpetright again.

Tapi is led by CEO Jeevan Karir, Executive Chairman (and largest shareholder) William Barker and Lord Harris of Peckham, who is honorary President.

== Philanthropy ==
From 2016 to 2024, Tapi raised over £170,000 for Great Ormond Street Hospital by donating £1 for every customer survey completed.

In 2025, Tapi launched a charity initiative called the Helping Hands Project which donates to local causes important to Tapi employees.

== Awards ==
In May 2026, Tapi was the winner of Best Big Retailer in The Sunday Times Best Places to Work 2026 list.
