= Carpetright =

British retailer

CWHP Limited
- Formerly: Hedgerows Limited (October–Nov 1988); Carpetwise (London) Limited (1988–1989); Carpetright of London Limited (1989–1993); Carpetright plc (1993–2020); Carpetright Limited (2020–2024)
- Type: Private
- Industry: Retail
- Products: Carpets
- Owner: Tapi Carpets
- Website: carpet-right.co.uk

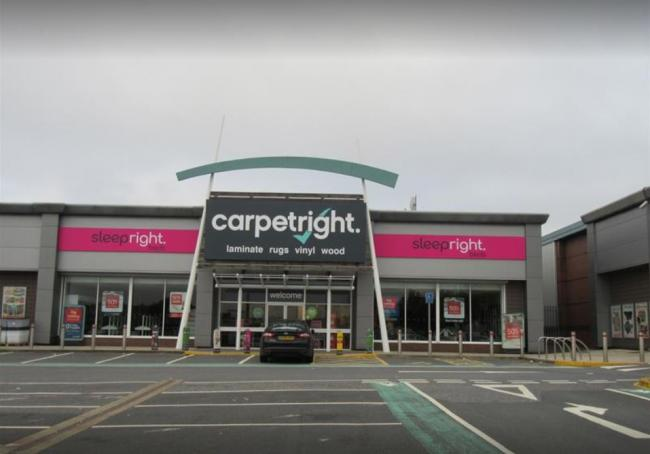
New Carpetright Store (2018)

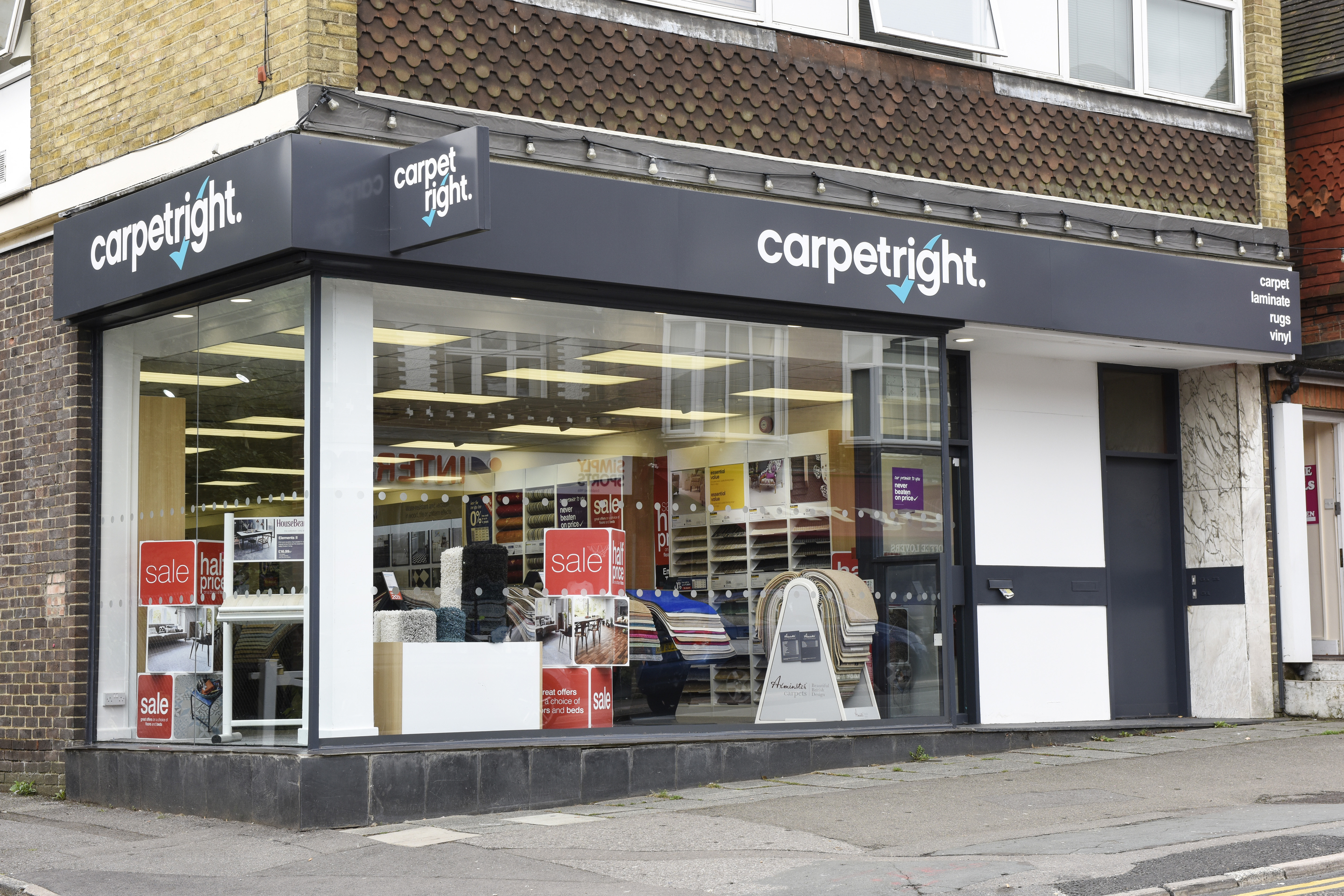
Carpetright in Oxted (2019)

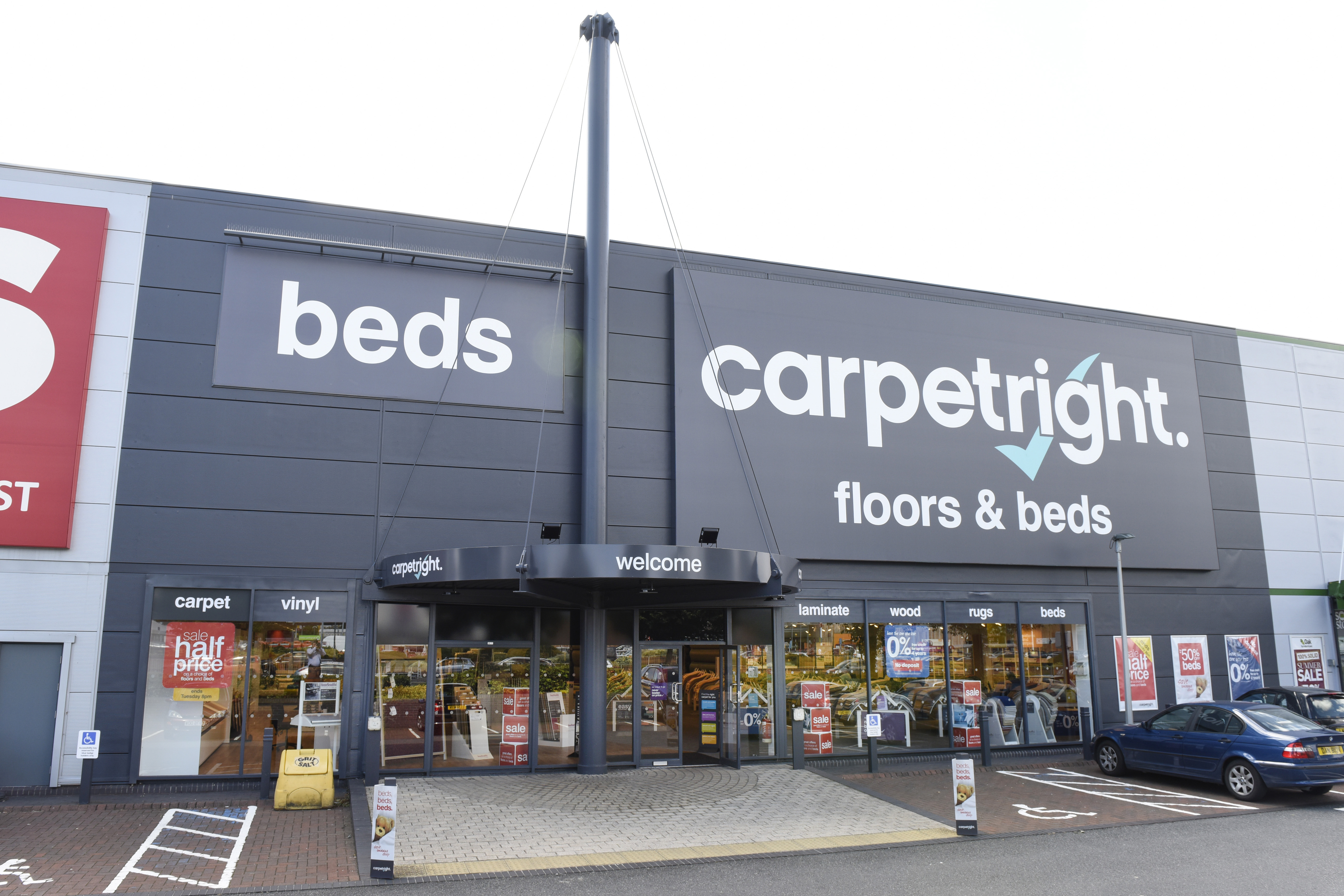
Carpetright in Croydon (2018)

Carpetright is a British carpet retailer founded in 1988 by Lord Philip Harris.

Since July 2024, the retailer has been a division of Tapi Carpets which purchased the Carpetright brand, intellectual property, and some locations from administration proceedings for £3.7 million.

== History ==
The company was established by Lord Philip Harris in 1988 when he opened its first shop in Canning Town. It was first listed on the London Stock Exchange in June 1993. In 1999, the company expanded through the acquisition of selected shops from Carpetland and Allied Carpets. It acquired its first operations in Continental Europe in 2002, and in 2005 acquired May’s World of Carpets. In 2007, it added the Storey Carpets business, a firm based in Sunderland, which had 54 stores at the time.

Cascade Investment, LLC, the investment vehicle of Bill Gates, acquired a 3% stake in the company in May 2008. Carpetright expanded again with the purchase of Sleepright UK in 2008. However, in June 2011 it announced significant shop closure plans and that year posted its first loss since 1993.

It was reported on 21 March 2018 that Carpetright was struggling after issuing several profit warnings, and that it was looking at possible shop closures. On 12 April 2018, it was announced that Carpetright would close 92 stores, with a total loss of 300 jobs out of the total workforce of 2,700, as part of restructuring measures.

In May 2018, Carpetright secured a £15 million loan to provide short-term working capital. In November 2019, Carpetright announced that its largest shareholder, Meditor, had agreed to purchase the company. A bid of £15.2 million was accepted by the company, amid fears it could not pay off its debt. Carpetright have estimated that the company would need around £80 million to get out of its debt problems. The company’s gross debt was evaluated at £56 million. According to Carpetright, the rescue deal will help the company complete a turnaround plan in the “very challenging consumer market”. The hedge fund that will acquire the retailer is headed by Talal Shakerchi, the former professional poker player and the former fund manager for Old Mutual. Investec Asset Management backed the bid made by Meditor with more than 11.3 million shares. Carpetright announced the departure of chairman Bob Ivell in January 2020, as the store returned to private ownership after more than 26 years. Several non-executive directors stood down from the board because of the takeover.

=== Sale to Tapi Carpets ===
In July 2024, Carpetright announced it had put itself up for sale, appointing PwC to launch a formal sale process. The firm was purchased in the same month by Tapi Carpets, in a pre-packaged insolvency deal, a transaction that is often associated with the new company shedding its commitments to staff and creditors.

As part of the acquisition, Tapi Carpets would acquire 54 stores, along with 300 jobs and 2 warehouses. The business outside the UK and Ireland (which would be kept by Nestware Holdings), 218 stores and the company's headquarters in Purfleet would not be part of the deal, affecting more than 1,000 jobs.

== Operations ==
As of 2019, the company had more than 470 shops. It has expanded into Belgium, the Netherlands, and the Republic of Ireland. It sells a wide variety of beds, mattresses, carpets, laminate flooring, vinyl flooring and rugs. On 14 October 2025, Carpetright was declared bankrupt in The Netherlands.

== Marketing ==
It was announced in March 2020 that Carpetright would become the new main shirt sponsor for Exeter City F.C. from the start of the 2020/21 season.
