= Vinyl flooring =

Vinyl flooring may refer to:

- Sheet vinyl flooring
- Vinyl composition tile
