= Monobutyl phthalate =

Names
- Preferred IUPAC name 2-(Butoxycarbonyl)benzoic acid
- Other names 1,2-Benzenedicarboxylic acid, monobutyl ester 2-(Butoxycarbonyl)benzoic acid Butyl hydrogenphthalate Mono-n-butyl phthalate Phthalic acid, monobutyl ester

Identifiers
CAS Number	131-70-4
3D model (JSmol)	Interactive image
ChEBI	CHEBI:88522
ChEMBL	ChEMBL2447930
ChemSpider	8257
ECHA InfoCard	100.004.580
EC Number	205-036-2
PubChem CID	8575
UNII	ZI46LWZ45G
CompTox Dashboard (EPA)	DTXSID4040002
- InChI: InChI=1S/C12H14O4/c1-2-3-8-16-12(15)10-7-5-4-6-9(10)11(13)14/h4-7H,2-3,8H2,1H3,(H,13,14) Key: YZBOVSFWWNVKRJ-UHFFFAOYSA-N
- SMILES: CCCCOC(=O)C1=CC=CC=C1C(=O)O

Properties
Chemical formula	C_{12}H_{14}O_{4}
Molar mass	222.240 g·mol^{−1}
Appearance	White solid
Melting point	73.5 °C (164.3 °F; 346.6 K)

Hazards
- GHS labelling
Pictograms	(GHS08: Health hazard)
Signal word	Danger
Hazard statements	H360
Precautionary statements	P201, P202, P281, P308+P313, P405, P501
- Lethal dose or concentration (LD, LC)
LD_{50} (median dose)	1,000 mg kg^{−1} (mouse, intraperitoneal)
- Except where otherwise noted, data are given for materials in their standard state (at 25 °C [77 °F], 100 kPa). Infobox references

Monobutyl phthalate (MBP) is an organic compound with the condensed structural formula CH_{3}(CH_{2})_{3}OOCC_{6}H_{4}COOH. It is a white solid that features both an butyl ester group and a carboxylic acid group. It is the major metabolite of dibutyl phthalate. Like many phthalates, MBP has attracted attention as a potential endocrine disruptor.

MBP is also the secondary metabolite of butyl benzyl phthalate, less than monobenzyl phthalate (MBzP). It hydrolyses to phthalic acid and 1-butanol.
