= Floor medallion =

Ornamental motif in flooring

A floor medallion is generally a centerpiece of flooring design that can be made with various flooring materials, including natural stone, wood, metal, tile, glass or a variety of other materials suitable for flooring. The pattern can be created using various methods such as mosaic, intarsia, and marquetry.

Floor medallion using stone intarsia (full thickness puzzle piece assembly)

With a mosaic, small pieces of flooring material are put together to develop a pattern. This can be done in a direct, indirect, or double indirect method. In the direct method small pieces are set directly into a bonding substrate like cement. Using an indirect method the pieces would be placed face down against paper or other material with a temporary adhesive. After the design is completed face down the entire section would be set into the floor and then have the paper removed, revealing the mosaic floor.

With intarsia pieces are cut to fit together like a puzzle. The pieces are generally thicker that those used in marquetry, and often full thickness rather than being laminated. For flooring the pattern is generally created face down so that it remains level and then flipped over and transferred into the floor.

Marquetry is often associated with woodworking, but can be done with any thin material. With marquetry very thin veneer, generally 1/16 inch or less and is cut to shape and then laminated over another surface. Inlay is thicker than marquetry, generally 1/8 to 5/8 inch thick, and is set within the material.

Mosaics have a distinctly different appearance than intarsia or marquetry. Intarsia and marquetry can appear very similar, but marquetry is much more common when semiprecious, or precious materials are being used.

Architects like Louis Sullivan used these to create unique centrepieces within spaces usually presenting an absence of detail. This was widely exhibited in his design of the 1904 department store known since that time as Carson Pirie Scott and Company.
