= Monobenzyl phthalate =

Chemical compound

Names
- Preferred IUPAC name 2-[(Benzyloxy)carbonyl]benzoic acid
- Other names Phthalic Acid Monobenzyl Ester; Benzyl hydrogen phthalate 1,2-Benzenedicarboxylic acid, mono(phenylmethyl) ester Mono(phenylmethyl) 1,2-benzenedicarboxylate 2-phenylmethoxycarbonylbenzoic acid

Identifiers
CAS Number	2528-16-7
3D model (JSmol)	Interactive image
ChEBI	CHEBI:132612
ChEMBL	ChEMBL1466083
ChemSpider	29430
ECHA InfoCard	100.017.974
EC Number	219-771-1
PubChem CID	31736
UNII	27NM8BNV1K
CompTox Dashboard (EPA)	DTXSID9043938
- InChI: InChI=1S/C15H12O4/c16-14(17)12-8-4-5-9-13(12)15(18)19-10-11-6-2-1-3-7-11/h1-9H,10H2,(H,16,17) Key: XIKIUQUXDNHBFR-UHFFFAOYSA-N
- SMILES: C1=CC=C(C=C1)COC(=O)C2=CC=CC=C2C(=O)O

Properties
Chemical formula	C_{15}H_{12}O_{4}
Molar mass	256.257 g·mol^{−1}

Hazards
- GHS labelling
Pictograms	(GHS07: Exclamation mark)
Signal word	Warning
Hazard statements	H319
Precautionary statements	P264, P280, P305+P351+P338, P337+P313
- Except where otherwise noted, data are given for materials in their standard state (at 25 °C [77 °F], 100 kPa). Infobox references

Monobenzyl phthalate (MBzP) also known as 1,2-Benzenedicarboxylic acid, 1-(phenylmethyl) ester is an organic compound with the condensed structural formula C_{6}H_{5}CH_{2}OOCC_{6}H_{4}COOH. It is the major metabolite of butyl benzyl phthalate(BBP), a common plasticizer. BBP can also be metabolized into monobutyl phthalate (MBP). Like many phthalates, BBP has attracted attention as a potential endocrine disruptor.
