= A. H. Woodfull =

English product designer (1912–2011)

Albert Henry "Woody" Woodfull (17 September 1912 – 24 June 2011) was an English product designer. Laying down many of the ground rules of industrial design in plastics while heading British Industrial Plastics' Product Design Unit, his work had international influence.

Woodfull was born in Birmingham and trained as a silversmith at the Vittoria Street School of Jewellery and Silversmithing before studying product design at the Birmingham School of Art. In 1934 he was appointed to British Industrial Plastics (BIP) as a product designer at their Streetly factory. His brief from the managing director was to "bring art to an artless industry", and his early work was largely in packaging, where designs such as his Ardath Cigarette Box of 1935 showed strong Art Deco influences and have become highly collectable.

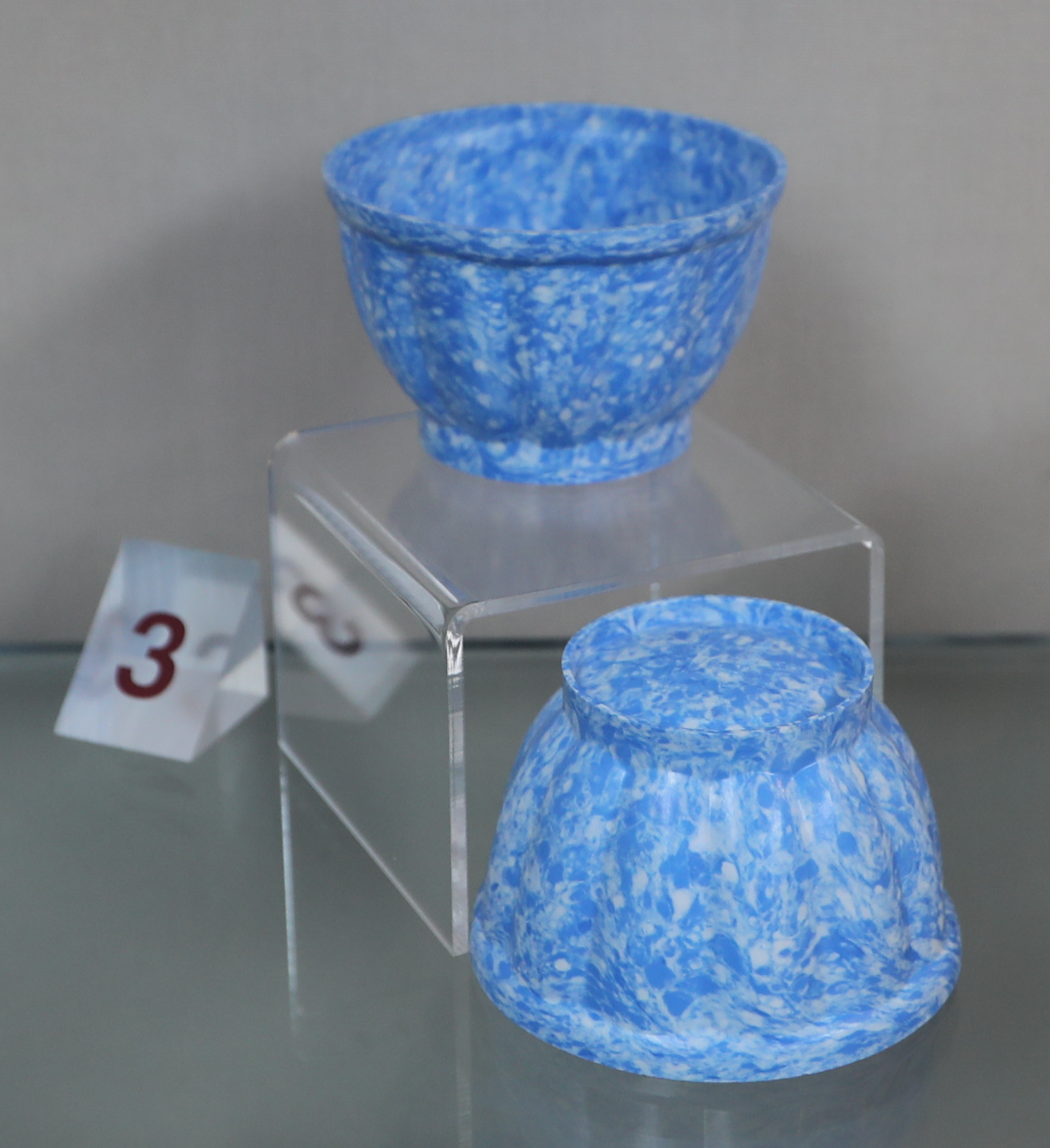
A pair of Beetleware jelly moulds

After World War II he produced notable promotional material for Cadbury's, but increasingly focussed on tableware, designing the classic Beetleware range in urea formaldehyde in 1946.

Woodfull visited the United States in 1948 to investigate the newly developed melamine formaldehyde material, whose greater water resistance was to lead it briefly to threaten ceramics as the dominant material in tableware.

In 1951 Woodfull was appointed to head BIP's newly formed Product Design Unit, where he was to remain until his retirement in 1970. As well as developing designs for BIP itself, the unit's Design Advisory Service aimed to provide design consultancy to companies developing products in plastics, with the aim of improving the public's perception of the quality of plastic products and increasing demand for BIP's materials. As a result, Woodfull and the team he built up were responsible to some degree for most of the designs for tableware in melamine that developed in the 1950s and 1960s, including the Gaydon and Melaware ranges that are now recognised as being among the pinnacles of 1960s plastics design.
