= 2-Cyanoguanidine =

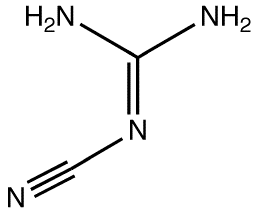

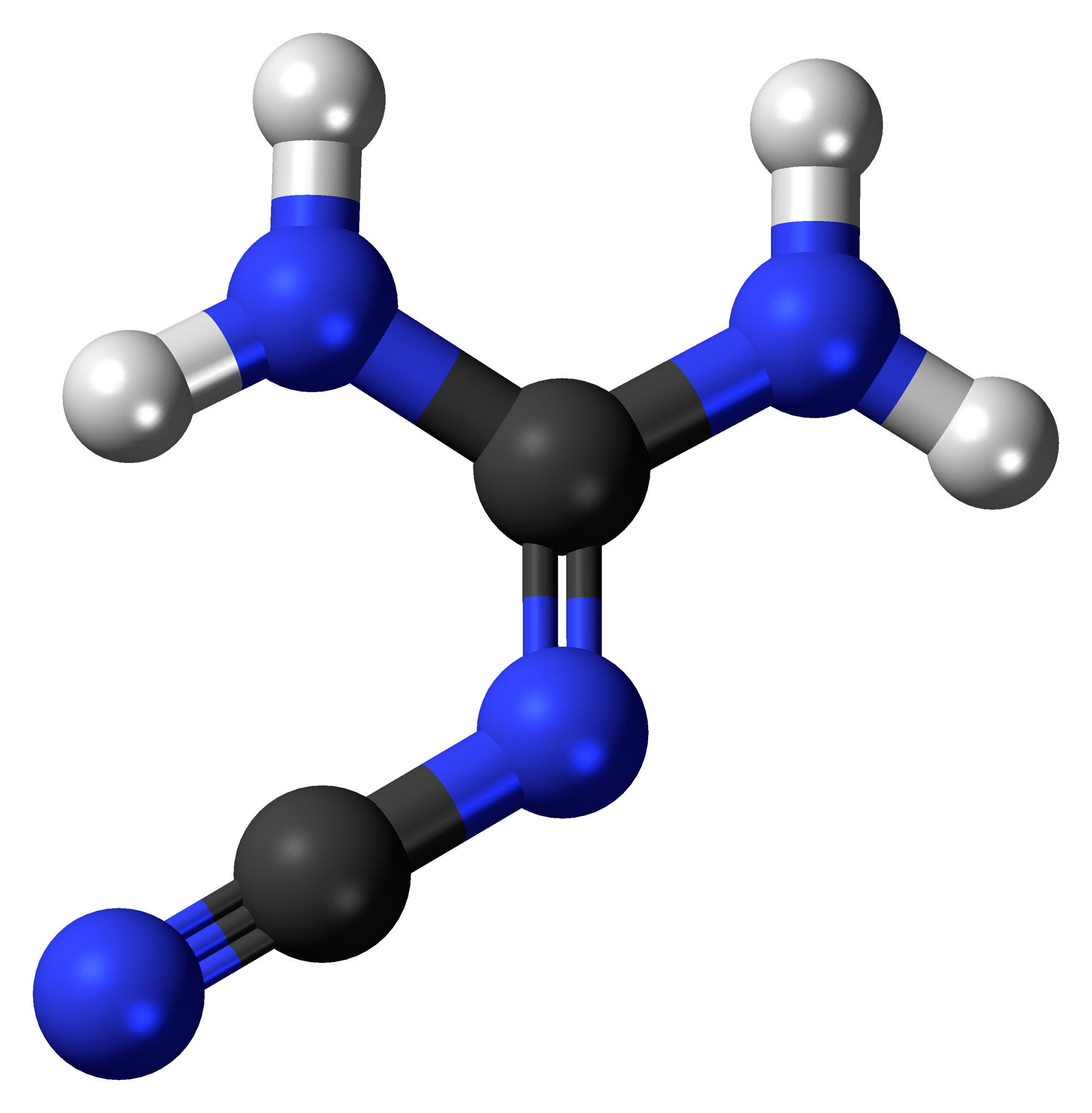

Names
- Preferred IUPAC name N′′-Cyanoguanidine
- Other names: Cyanoguanidine; Dicyandiamide; Dicyanodiamide; N-cyanoguanidine; 1-cyanoguanidine; Guanidine-1-carbonitrile; Didin; DCD; Dicy

Identifiers
CAS Number	461-58-5
3D model (JSmol)	Interactive image; isomer: Interactive image; zwitterion: Interactive image
ChEBI	CHEBI:147423
ChemSpider	9611
ECHA InfoCard	100.006.649
EC Number	207-312-8
PubChem CID	10005
RTECS number	ME9950000
UNII	M9B1R0C16H
CompTox Dashboard (EPA)	DTXSID1020354
- InChI: InChI=1S/C2H4N4/c3-1-6-2(4)5/h(H4,4,5,6) Key: QGBSISYHAICWAH-UHFFFAOYSA-N; InChI=1/C2H4N4/c3-1-6-2(4)5/h(H4,4,5,6) Key: QGBSISYHAICWAH-UHFFFAOYAY
- SMILES: N#CNC(=N)N; isomer: N#CN=C(N)N; zwitterion: N#CN=C([NH-])[NH3+]

Properties
Chemical formula	C_{2}H_{4}N_{4}
Molar mass	84.082 g·mol^{−1}
Appearance	White crystals
Density	1.4 g/cm^{3}
Melting point	209.5 °C (409.1 °F; 482.6 K)
Boiling point	252 °C (486 °F; 525 K)
Solubility in water	41.3 g/L
Solubility in acetone	soluble
Solubility in ethanol	soluble
log P	−1.5 (est)
Henry's law constant (k_{H})	2.25×10^{−10} (atm·m^{3})/mol
Acidity (pK_{a})	14.8
Basicity (pK_{b})	14.4
Magnetic susceptibility (χ)	−44.55×10^{−6} cm^{3}/mol

Hazards
- Lethal dose or concentration (LD, LC)
LD_{50} (median dose)	>30000 mg/kg (oral, rat)
- Except where otherwise noted, data are given for materials in their standard state (at 25 °C [77 °F], 100 kPa). verify (what is ?) Infobox references

2-Cyanoguanidine is a nitrile derived from guanidine. It is a dimer of cyanamide, from which it can be prepared.

== Production and use ==
2-Cyanoguanidine is produced by treating cyanamide with base. It is produced in soil by decomposition of cyanamide. A variety of useful compounds are produced from 2-cyanoguanidine, guanidines and melamine. For example, acetoguanamine and benzoguanamine are prepared by condensation of cyanoguanidine with the nitrile:

(H_{2}N)_{2}C=NCN + PhCN → 1,3-(H_{2}N)-5-Ph(C_{3}N_{3})

Cyanoguanidine is also used as a nitrification inhibitor in stabilized nitrogen fertilizers. It is used in the adhesive industry as a curing agent for epoxy resins. Formerly, it was used as a fuel in some explosives, and may be used as a stabilizer for nitrocellulose.

It was patented for use in the synthesis of methylphenobarbital.

== Chemistry ==
The structure has been confirmed by X-ray crystallography. The molecule is planar with two primary amine groups attached to an imino nitrile. According to Raman spectroscopy measurements, solutions also contain a tautomer, (H_{2}N)HN=CN(H)CN.

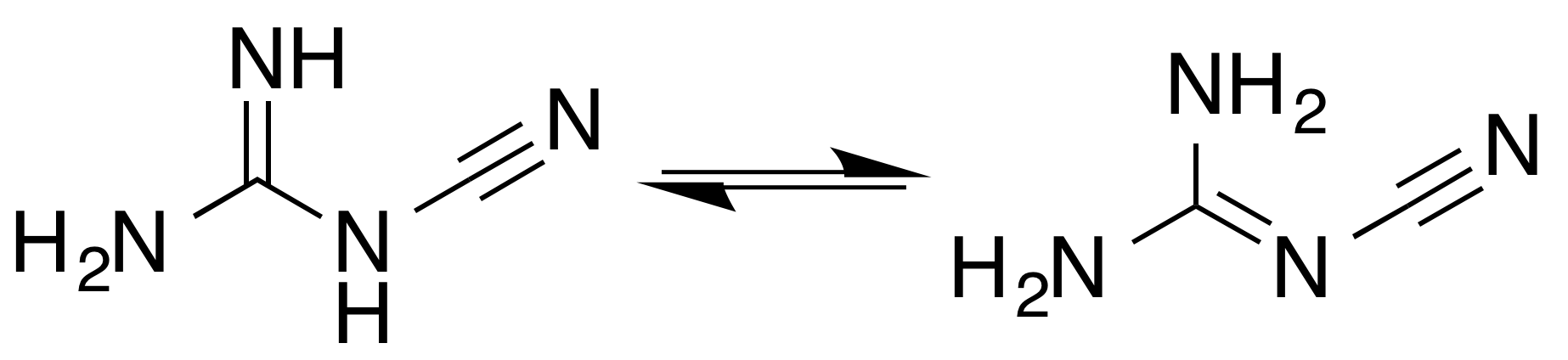

2-cyanoguanidine is isomeric to ammonium dicyanamide, from which it may be prepared by heating in a closed vessel. The reaction proceeds via a zwitterionic intermediate, analogous to the Wöhler synthesis of urea from ammonium cyanate.
