= Benzoguanamine =

Names
- Preferred IUPAC name 6-Phenyl-1,3,5-triazine-2,4-diamine
- Other names Diamino-6-phenyl-1,3,5-triazine

Identifiers
CAS Number	91-76-9
3D model (JSmol)	Interactive image
ChEMBL	ChEMBL337319
ChemSpider	6797
ECHA InfoCard	100.001.905
EC Number	202-095-6
PubChem CID	7064
RTECS number	XY700000
UNII	B9E2Q3VTUB
CompTox Dashboard (EPA)	DTXSID1020142
- InChI: InChI=1S/C9H9N5/c10-8-12-7(13-9(11)14-8)6-4-2-1-3-5-6/h1-5H,(H4,10,11,12,13,14) Key: GZVHEAJQGPRDLQ-UHFFFAOYSA-N
- SMILES: Nc1nc(c2ccccc2)nc(N)n1

Properties
Chemical formula	C_{9}H_{9}N_{5}
Molar mass	187.206 g·mol^{−1}
Appearance	White solid
Density	1.42 g cm^{−3}
Melting point	227–228 °C (441–442 °F; 500–501 K)

Hazards
- GHS labelling
Pictograms	(GHS06: Toxic) (GHS07: Exclamation mark)
Signal word	Warning
Hazard statements	H302, H331, H332, H412
Precautionary statements	P261, P264, P270, P271, P273, P301+P312, P304+P312, P304+P340, P311, P312, P321, P330, P403+P233, P405, P501
- Except where otherwise noted, data are given for materials in their standard state (at 25 °C [77 °F], 100 kPa). verify (what is ?) Infobox references

Benzoguanamine is an organic compound with the chemical formula (CNH_{2})_{2}(CC_{6}H_{5})N_{3}. It is related to melamine but with one amino group replaced by phenyl. Benzoguanamine is used in the manufacturing of melamine resins. Unlike melamine ((CNH_{2})_{3}N_{3}), benzoguanamine is not a crosslinker. The "benzo" prefix is historical, as the compound contains phenyl, not a benzo group. A related compound is acetoguanamine.

The compound is prepared by the condensation reaction of cyanoguanidine with benzonitrile:

== Safety ==
The LD_{50} (oral, rats) is 1470 mg/kg.
