= Melamine resin =

Hard, thermosetting plastic material often used in dinnerware

Idealized subunit of a melamine-formaldehyde resin (R - H, alkyl)

Melamine resin or melamine formaldehyde (also shortened to melamine) is a resin with melamine rings terminated with multiple hydroxyl groups derived from formaldehyde. This thermosetting plastic material is made from melamine and formaldehyde. In its butylated form, it is dissolved in n-butanol and xylene. It is then used to cross-link with alkyd, epoxy, acrylic, and polyester resins, used in surface coatings. There are many types, varying from very slow to very fast curing.

== Curing ==
Melamine-formaldehyde can be cured by heating, which induces dehydration and crosslinking. The crosslinking can be carried out to a limited degree to give resins. Either the melamine-formaldehyde resins or melamine-formaldehyde "monomer" can be cured by treatment with any of several polyols. As a thermosetting plastic, melamine resin is hardened by placing it in powder form in a mold, closing it and then exerting high pressure on it in a press, until the resin hardens into a solid product such as tableware. The raw powder is also known as amino melamine compound, and versions that replace melamine with urea exist for non-food applications. Liquid forms of melamine resin are used as adhesives in wood products such as particle board to bind the wood particles together as well as the laminate on the particle board.

== Applications ==
=== Construction material ===
The principal use of melamine resin is as the main constituent of high-pressure laminates, such as Formica and Arborite, and of laminate flooring. Melamine-resin tile wall panels can also be used as whiteboards. Melamine formaldehyde is used in plastic laminate and overlay materials. Formaldehyde is more tightly bound in melamine-formaldehyde than it is in urea-formaldehyde. This results in somewhat reduced levels of harmful formaldehyde emissions.

=== Other ===
==== In the kitchen ====
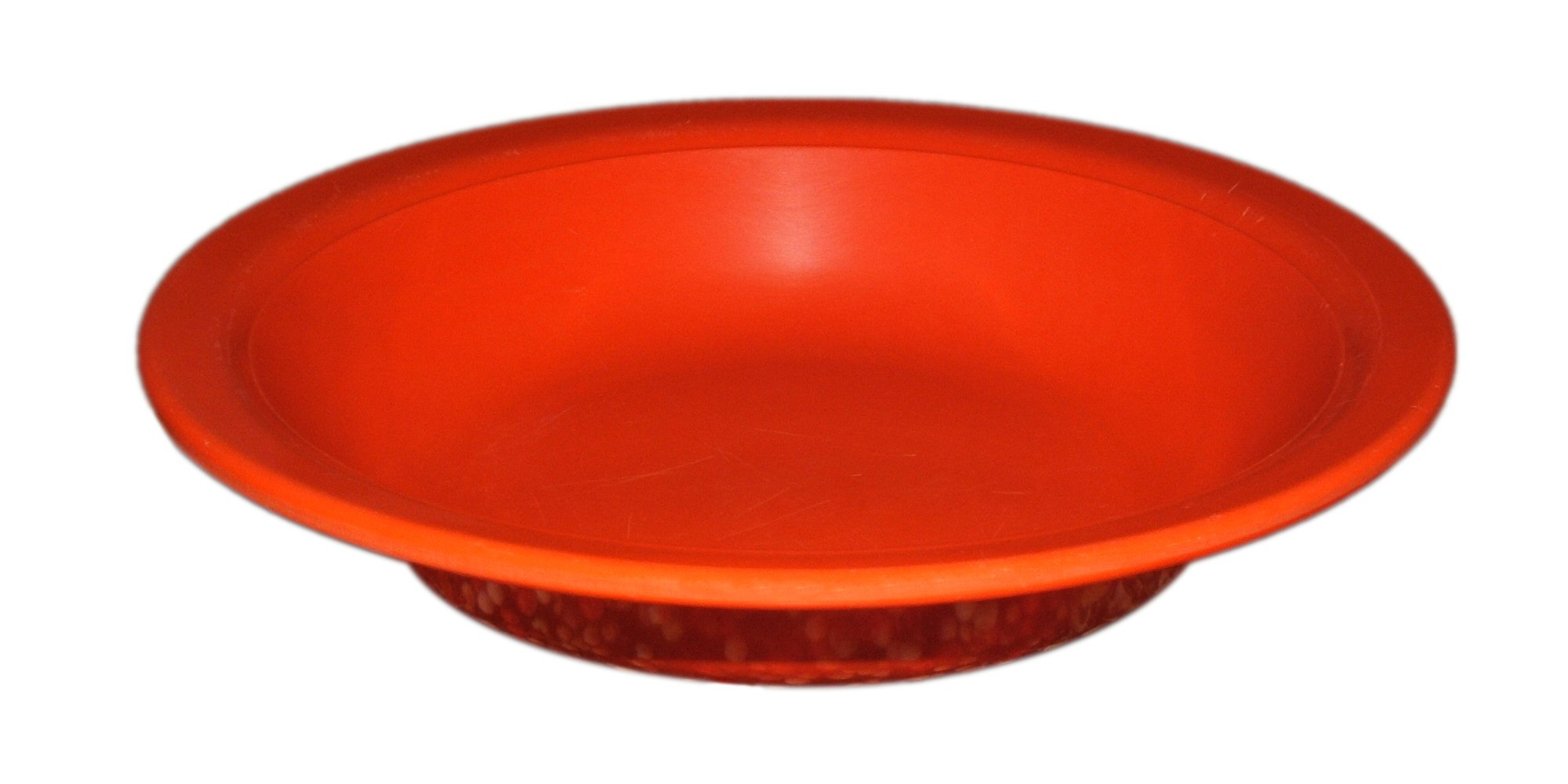
A melamine-resin plate

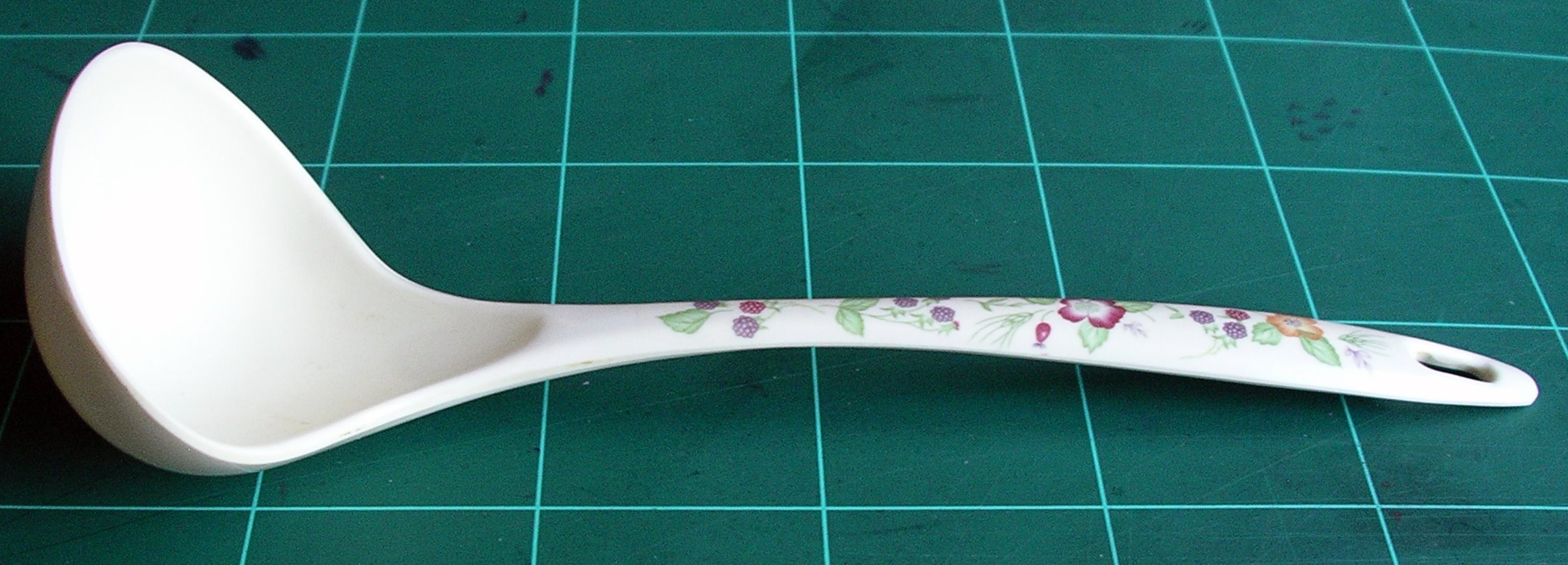
A melamine-resin ladle

Melamine resin is often used in kitchen utensils and plates (such as Melmac). Melamine resin utensils and bowls are not microwave safe.

During the late 1950s and 1960s melamine tableware became fashionable. Aided by the stylish modern designs of A. H. Woodfull and the Product Design Unit of British Industrial Plastics, it was thought to threaten the dominant position of ceramics in the market. In the late 1960s the tendency of melamine cups and plates to become stained and scratched led to a decline in sales, and eventually the material became largely restricted to the camping and nursery markets, in which its light weight and resistance to breaking were valued.

==== Cabinet and furniture making ====
Melamine resin is often used to saturate decorative paper that is laminated under heat and pressure and then pasted onto particle board; the resulting panel, often called melamine, is commonly used in ready-to-assemble furniture and kitchen cabinets.

Melamine is available in diverse sizes and thicknesses, as well as a large number of colors and patterns. The sheets are heavy for their size, and the resin is prone to chipping when being cut with conventional table saws.

==== Carbon capture ====
Melamine, with the addition of formaldehyde, cyanuric acid, and DETA (diethylenetriamine) has been demonstrated to bind CO_{2} for purposes of carbon capture, according to researchers at Stanford, Berkeley, and Texas A&M.

==== Microencapsulation of active compounds ====
Melamine-based resin (e.g., melamine-formaldehyde or melamine-urea-formaldehyde resins) can also be used to microencapsulate active agents, such as healing agents or phase change materials, to prevent leakage above their melting temperature. The resulting surface is quite inert and can hardly be modified with traditional techniques such as silanization. Some research has shown that polydopamine can be effective as a surface modifier for this resin.

== Production and structure ==
Melamine-formaldehyde resin forms via the condensation of formaldehyde with melamine to give, under idealized conditions, the hexa-hydroxymethyl derivative. Upon heating in the presence of acid, this or similar hydroxymethylated species undergoes further condensation and crosslinking. Linkages between the heterocycles include mono-, di-, and polyethers. The microstructure of the material can be analyzed by NMR spectroscopy. The crosslinking density of melamine resins can be controlled by co-condensation with bifunctional analogues of melamine, benzoguanamine and acetoguanamine.

Idealized chemical reactions leading to melamine-formaldehyde resin (Melmac)

== See also ==
- Melamine foam is a special form of melamine resin. It is used mainly as an insulating and soundproofing material and more recently as a cleaning abrasive.
- Formica is a brand of composite materials manufactured by the Formica Corporation. In common use, the term refers to the company's classic product, a heat-resistant, wipe-clean, plastic laminate of paper or fabric with melamine resin.
