= Acetoguanamine =

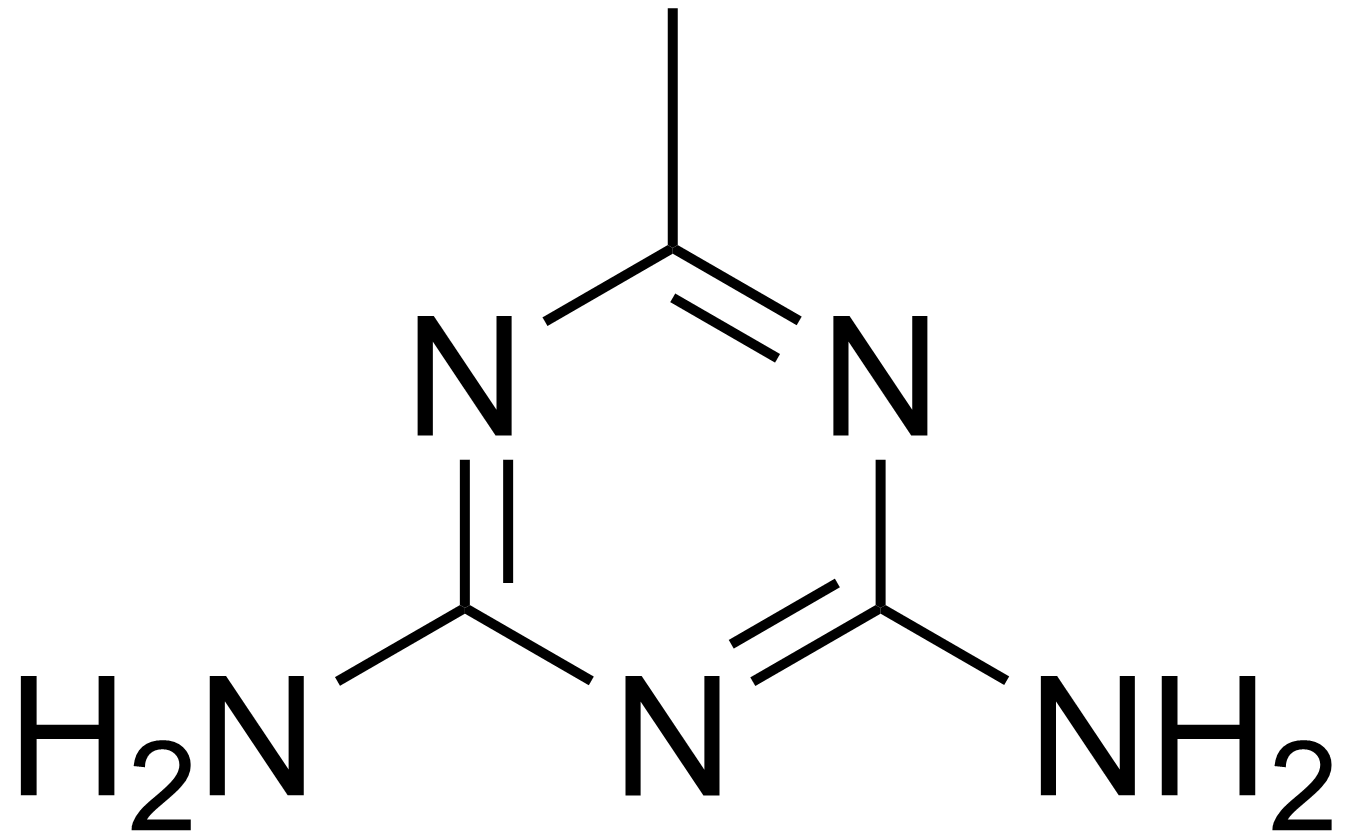

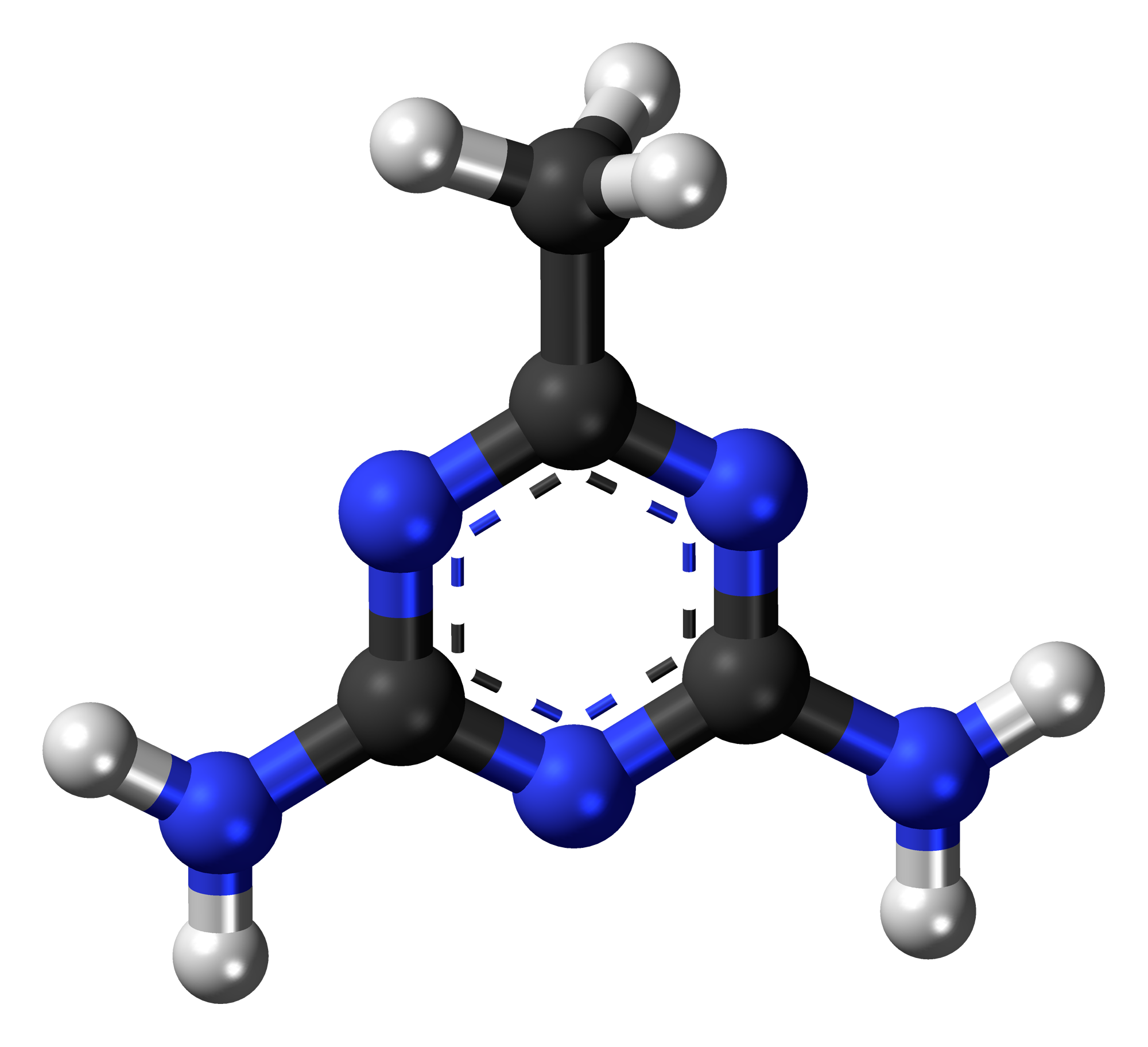

Names
- Preferred IUPAC name 6-Methyl-1,3,5-triazine-2,4-diamine
- Other names Diamino-6-methyl-1,3,5-triazine

Identifiers
CAS Number	542-02-9
3D model (JSmol)	Interactive image; Interactive image
Beilstein Reference	118348
ChEBI	CHEBI:72475
ChemSpider	10485
ECHA InfoCard	100.007.998
EC Number	208-796-3
PubChem CID	10949
UNII	AX41T8ULB3
CompTox Dashboard (EPA)	DTXSID5029186
- InChI: InChI=1S/C4H7N5/c1-2-7-3(5)9-4(6)8-2/h1H3,(H4,5,6,7,8,9) Key: NJYZCEFQAIUHSD-UHFFFAOYSA-N; InChI=1/C4H7N5/c1-2-7-3(5)9-4(6)8-2/h1H3,(H4,5,6,7,8,9) Key: NJYZCEFQAIUHSD-UHFFFAOYAD
- SMILES: Cc1nc(N)nc(N)n1; CC1=NC(N)=NC(N)=N1

Properties
Chemical formula	C_{4}H_{7}N_{5}
Molar mass	125.135 g·mol^{−1}
Appearance	White, opaque crystals
Density	1.391 g cm^{−3}
Melting point	274 to 276 °C (525 to 529 °F; 547 to 549 K)

Hazards
- GHS labelling
Pictograms	(GHS07: Exclamation mark)
Signal word	Warning
Hazard statements	H315, H319, H335
Precautionary statements	P261, P305+P351+P338
NFPA 704 (fire diamond)	1 1 0
Flash point	252 °C (486 °F; 525 K)
- Except where otherwise noted, data are given for materials in their standard state (at 25 °C [77 °F], 100 kPa). verify (what is ?) Infobox references

Acetoguanamine is an organic compound with the chemical formula (CNH_{2})_{2}CCH_{3}N_{3}. It is related to melamine but with one amino group replaced by methyl. Acetoguanamine is used in the manufacturing of melamine resins. Unlike melamine ((CNH_{2})_{3}N_{3}), acetoguanamine is not a crosslinker. The "aceto" prefix is historical, the compound does not contain an acetyl group. A related compound is benzoguanamine.

The compound is prepared by condensation of cyanoguanidine with acetonitrile:

(H_{2}N)_{2}C=NCN + MeCN → (CNH_{2})_{2}(CMe)N_{3}

== Safety ==
The LD_{50} (oral, rats) of acetoguanamine is 2740 mg/kg.
