= National Tiles =

Australian building materials company

- Type: Proprietary company
- Industry: Retail, wholesale
- Founded: 1979; 47 years ago in Geelong, Victoria, Australia
- Headquarters: Port Melbourne, Victoria, Australia
- Area served: Australia
- Products: Wall and floor tiles, stone, timber, hybrid, laminate and vinyl flooring
- Website: www.nationaltiles.com.au

National Tiles is an Australian retailer and supplier of wall and floor tiles, hard-surface flooring and surface products for residential, commercial and building projects. The company operates retail stores and an online business in Australia.

== History ==
National Tiles began in Geelong, Victoria, in 1979, with the Walker family living above the original store. The company subsequently expanded beyond Victoria, opening its first Queensland store in the late 2000s and later expanding into New South Wales, South Australia and other markets. In 2015, the company was pursuing a five-year expansion plan covering New South Wales, the Northern Territory, South Australia and Queensland, while sourcing products from suppliers in Europe, Argentina and China.

By 2019, National Tiles employed about 400 people and operated 36 stores across Victoria, South Australia, New South Wales and Queensland.

In 2021, Campbell Stott succeeded Nick Walker as CEO, while Walker joined the company's board. The company expanded into Tasmania, opening its first store in Cambridge near Hobart in July 2021, and opened its first showroom in Sydney in the same period.

In February 2022, National Tiles sold three Victorian showroom and warehouse properties in Mitcham, Sunshine and Grovedale for more than A$21 million in a sale and leaseback transaction, with 12-year leases for the properties. The sale listings described the company as having about 500 employees and 38 stores, with FY2021 turnover of about A$150 million. In 2023, National Tiles agreed to 10-year leases for new distribution centres at Tarneit, Victoria, and Yatala, Queensland, with facilities of approximately 20,710 m² and 17,500 m² respectively.

In 2026, the Victorian Court of Appeal dismissed former director John Selak's claim for approximately A$1 million in damages over a share option agreement with National Tiles.

== Operations ==
National Tiles sells tiles, pavers, timber, hybrid, laminate and vinyl flooring, as well as installation materials. Its customers include residential consumers, tradespeople and builders.

The company operates more than 40 locations across Victoria, Queensland, New South Wales, South Australia and Tasmania. For design and estimation, National Tiles uses digital tools including Tile Express and a 3D configurator developed with Finnish software company VividWorks.

== Advertising and public profile ==
National Tiles has run a long-standing radio advertising campaign featuring its founder, Frank Walker. In 2022, Campaign Brief described the campaign as one of Australia's most recognisable radio campaigns. According to Nick Walker, Frank began recording the advertisements because the company could not afford a professional voice-over artist. By 2019, the advertisements had used the same opening greeting for more than two decades and had been broadcast on the Australian Radio Network. Frank Walker also appeared on Network 10's The Project discussing the advertisements.

The advertisements have also been used in music remixes and live performances. In 2017, Vice reported on a mash-up of a National Tiles advertisement with Eminem's "My Name Is". In 2018, Mashd N Kutcher played a National Tiles advertisement during a performance before an audience of about 10,000 people in Germany; a video of the incident received more than 800,000 views within several days, according to The Music Network.

In August 2022, National Tiles launched the television advertising campaign "Whatever You're Into", which was developed in-house. In September 2026, it launched "Annoyingly Good", a campaign created with advertising agency Sunday Gravy that featured Frank Walker appearing in simulated commercials for other products. B&T reported that research conducted for the campaign found that many Australians described the company's advertising as "annoying", while also considering it one of the brand's strengths.
