= Laminate flooring =

Type of manufactured floor covering

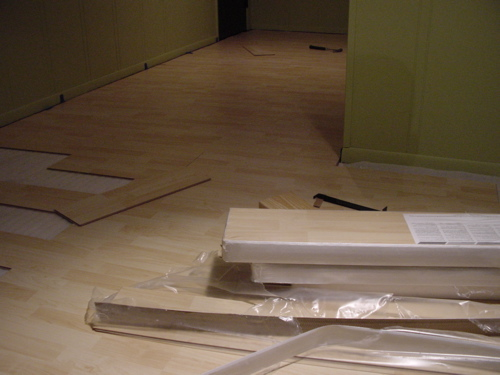
Pergo flooring project

Laminate flooring (also called floating wood tile in the United States) is a multi-layer synthetic flooring product fused together with a lamination process. Laminate flooring simulates wood (or sometimes stone) with a photographic appliqué layer under a clear protective layer. The inner core layer is usually composed of melamine resin and fiber board materials. There is a European Standard No. EN 13329:2000 specifying laminate floor covering requirements and testing methods.

Laminate flooring has grown significantly in popularity, perhaps because it may be easier to install and maintain than more traditional surfaces such as hardwood flooring. It may also have the advantages of costing less and requiring less skill to install than alternative flooring materials. It is reasonably durable, hygienic (several brands contain an antimicrobial resin), and relatively easy to maintain.

== Installation ==
Laminate floors are reasonably easy for a DIY homeowner to install. Laminate flooring is packaged as a number of tongue and groove planks, which can be clicked into one another. Sometimes a glue backing is provided for ease of installation. Installed laminate floors typically "float" over the sub-floor on top of a foam/film underlayment, which provides moisture- and sound-reducing properties. A small (1–10 mm [1/16–3/8 in]) gap is required between the flooring and any immovable object such as walls; this allows the flooring to expand without being obstructed. Baseboards (skirting boards) can be removed and then reinstalled after laying of the flooring is complete for a neater finish, or the baseboard can be left in place with the flooring butted into it, then small beading trims such as shoe moulding or the larger quarter-round moulding can be fitted to the bottoms of the baseboards. Saw cuts on the planks are usually required at edges and around cupboard and door entrances, but professional installers typically use door jamb undercut saws to cut out a space to a height that allows the flooring to go under the door jamb and casing for a cleaner look.

Improper installation can result in peaking, in which adjacent boards form an inverted V shape projecting from the floor, or gaps, in which two adjacent boards are separated from each other.

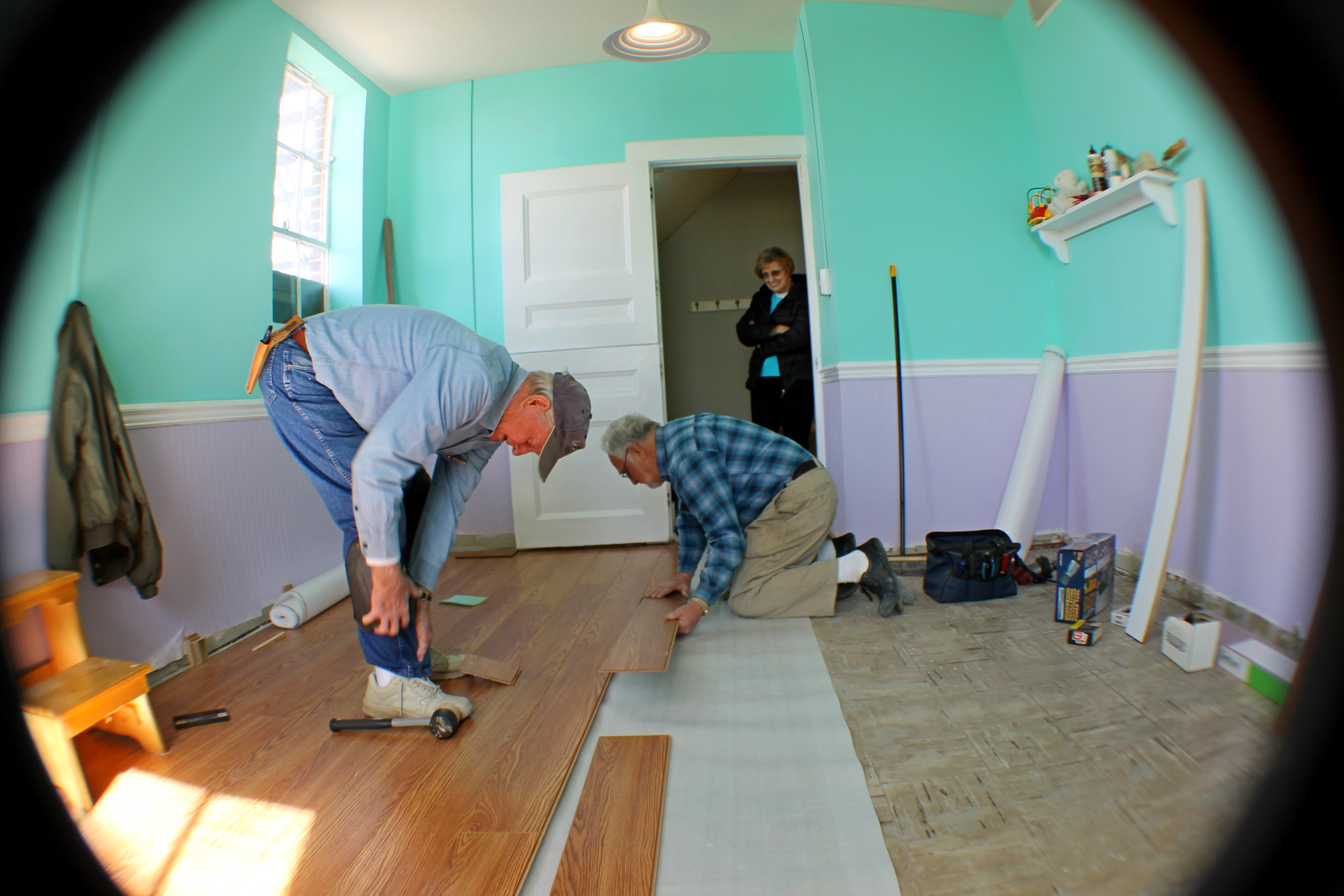
Installation of laminate flooring – note underlay to allow for contraction, expansion, and moisture control and method for squaring and distancing from wall.

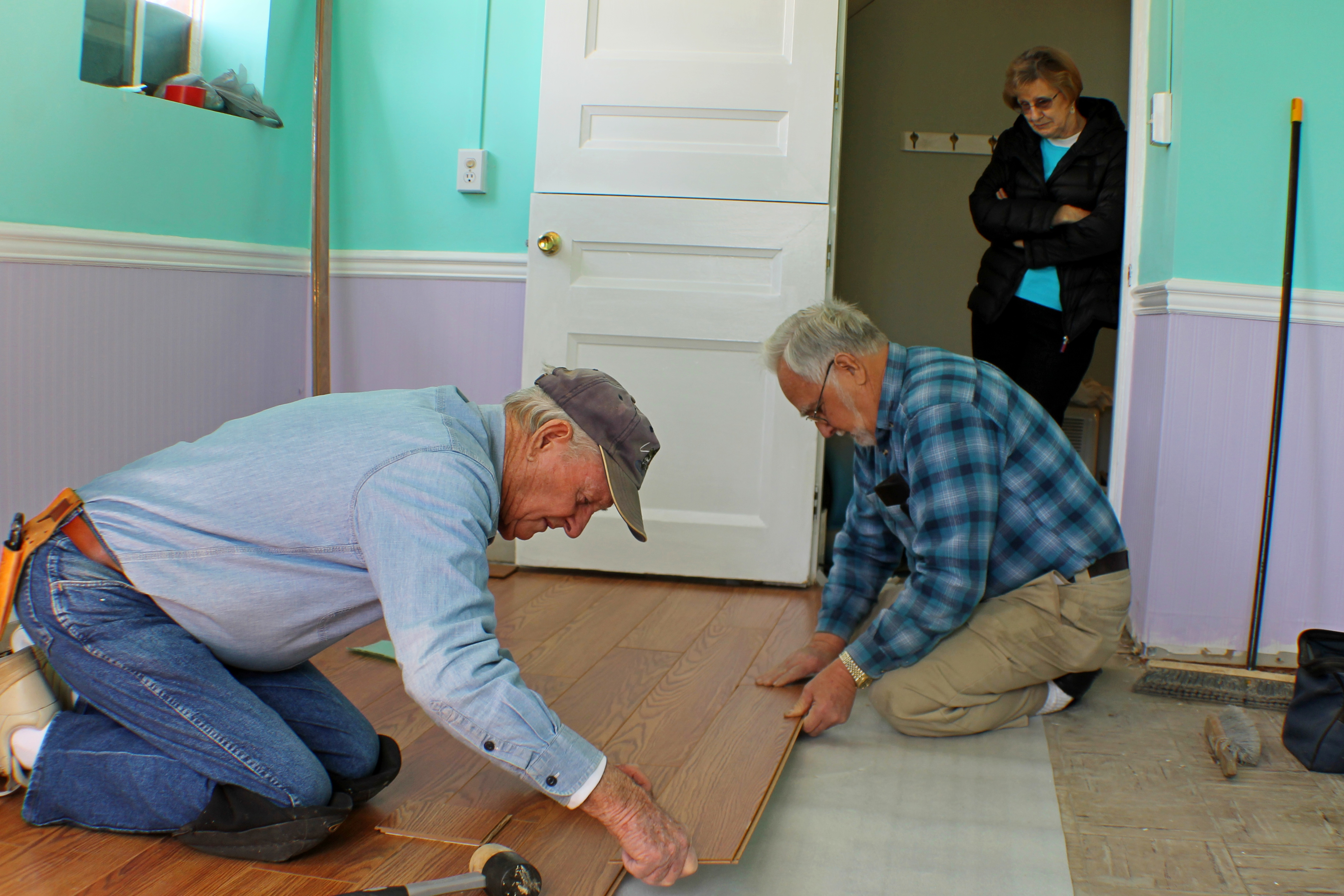
Fitting individual laminate planks

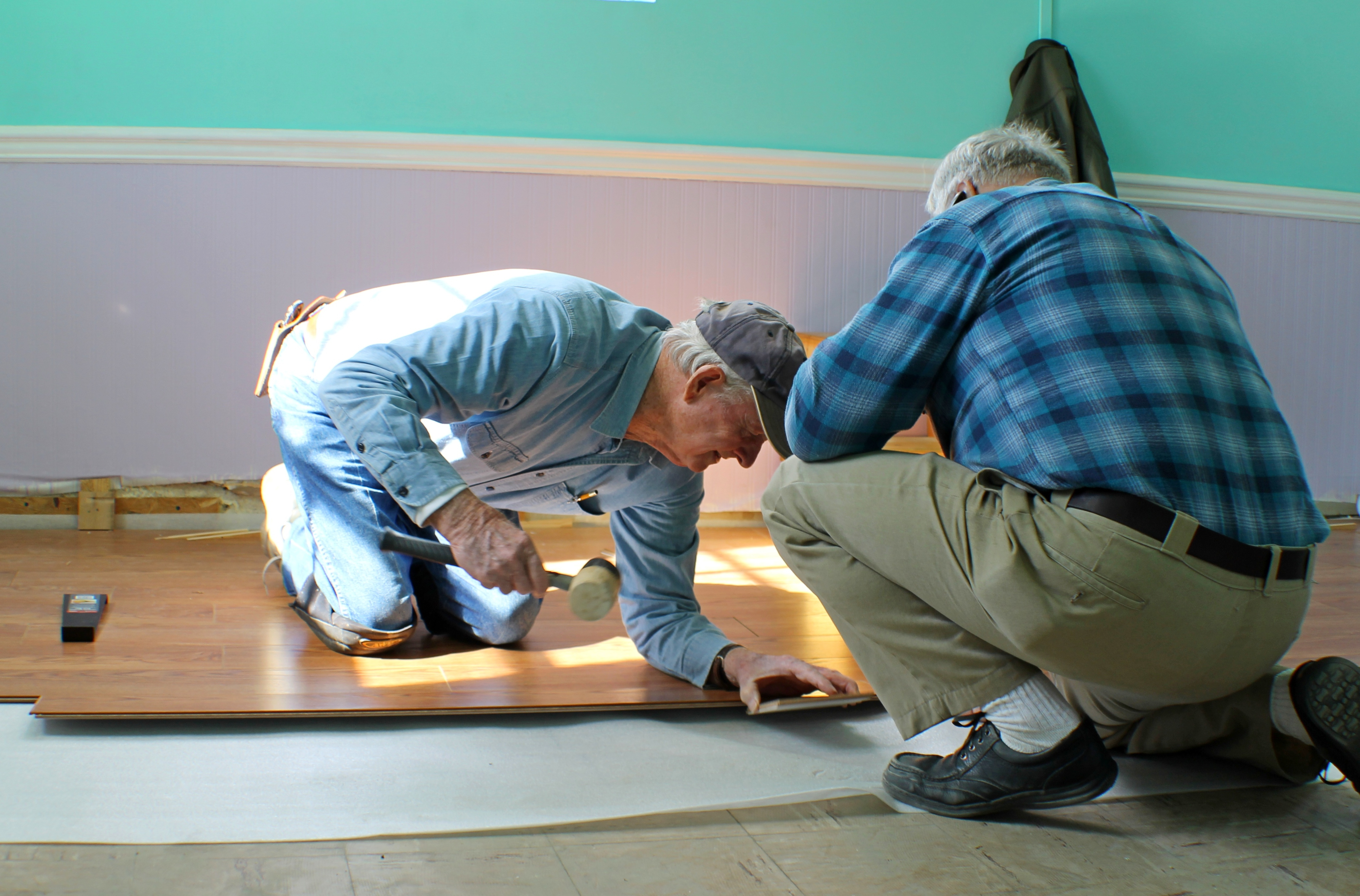
Secure tongue-and-groove connections create floor that is both tight and flexible.

== Care ==
It is important to keep laminate clean, as dust, dirt, and sand particles may scratch the surface over time in high-traffic areas. It is also important to keep laminate relatively dry, since sitting water/moisture can cause the planks to swell, warp, etc., though some brands are equipped with water-resistant coatings. Water spills are not a problem if they are wiped up quickly, and not allowed to sit for a prolonged period of time.

Adhesive felt pads are often placed on the feet of furniture on laminate floors to prevent scratching.

Inferior glueless laminate floors may gradually become separated, creating visible gaps between planks. It is important to "tap" the planks back together using the appropriate tool as gaps are noticed in order to prevent dirt filling the gaps, thus making it more difficult to put into place.

Quality glueless laminate floors use joining mechanisms which hold the planks together under constant tension which prevent dirt entering the joints and do not need "tapping" back together periodically.

== Advocacy ==
The North American Laminate Flooring Association (NALFA) is a trade association of laminate flooring manufacturers and laminate flooring manufacturer suppliers in the United States and Canada. It is a standards developing organization accredited by the American National Standards Institute (ANSI) to develop voluntary consensus standards for laminate flooring materials, and it has established testing and performance criteria that are used in North America.

NALFA issues a certification mark named the NALFA Certification Seal which signifies that the product has passed 10 performance tests, has been proven to meet these standards by an independent, third-party testing lab, and has been manufactured in North America. The certification review includes:

1. Static Load – Measures the ability of laminate flooring to resist residual indentation resulting from a static load.
2. Thickness Swell – Measures the ability of laminate flooring to resist increase in thickness after being exposed to water.
3. Light Resistance – Measures the ability of laminate flooring to retain its color when exposed to a light source having a frequency range approximating sunlight through window glass. It is not intended to show the resistance to continuous exposure to outdoor weathering conditions.
4. Cleanability and Stain Resistance – Measures both the ease of cleanability and stain resistance of laminate flooring to common household substances.
5. Large Ball Resistance – Measures the ability of laminate flooring to resist fracture due to impact by a large diameter ball.
6. Small Ball Resistance – Measures the ability of laminate flooring to resist fracture due to impact by a small diameter ball.
7. Water Resistance – Measures the ability of the surface of laminate flooring to resist abrasive wear through the décor layer.
8. Dimension Tolerance – Measures the dimensional variance between tiles of laminate flooring in a manufactured free standing (unrestricted) shape in respect to thickness, length, width, straightness and squareness.
9. Caster Chair Resistance – Specifies a method for determining the change of appearance and stability of a laminate floor, including joints, under the movement of a caster chair.
10. Surface Bond – Measures the force required to delaminate or split away the surface of laminate flooring plank or tile.

== Potential health effects and LEED status ==
Laminate flooring is often made of melamine resin, a compound made with formaldehyde. The formaldehyde is more tightly bound in melamine formaldehyde (MF) than it is in urea-formaldehyde (UF), reducing emissions and potential health effects. Thus LEED v2.2's EQ Credit 4.4 precludes the use of UF, but allows the use of MF.

Laminated flooring is commonly used in LEED residential and commercial applications.

== History ==
Laminate flooring was invented in 1977 by the Swedish company Perstorp, and sold under the brand name Pergo. They had been making floor surfaces since 1923. The company first marketed its product to Europe in 1984, and later to the United States in 1994. Perstorp spun off its flooring division as the separate company named Pergo, now a subsidiary of Mohawk Industries. Pergo is the most widely known laminate flooring manufacturer, but the trademark PERGO is not synonymous for all laminate floors.

Glueless laminate flooring was invented in 1996 by the Swedish company Välinge Aluminium (now Välinge Innovation) and sold under the names of Alloc and Fiboloc. However, a system for holding flooring panels together was also developed in parallel by the Belgian company Unilin released in 1997 and sold under the name of Quick-Step flooring.

The two companies have been in a great number of legal conflicts over the years, and today most, if not all glueless locking flooring is made under license from either Välinge, Unilin, or even a combination of both.
