= Vinyl composition tile =

Flooring material

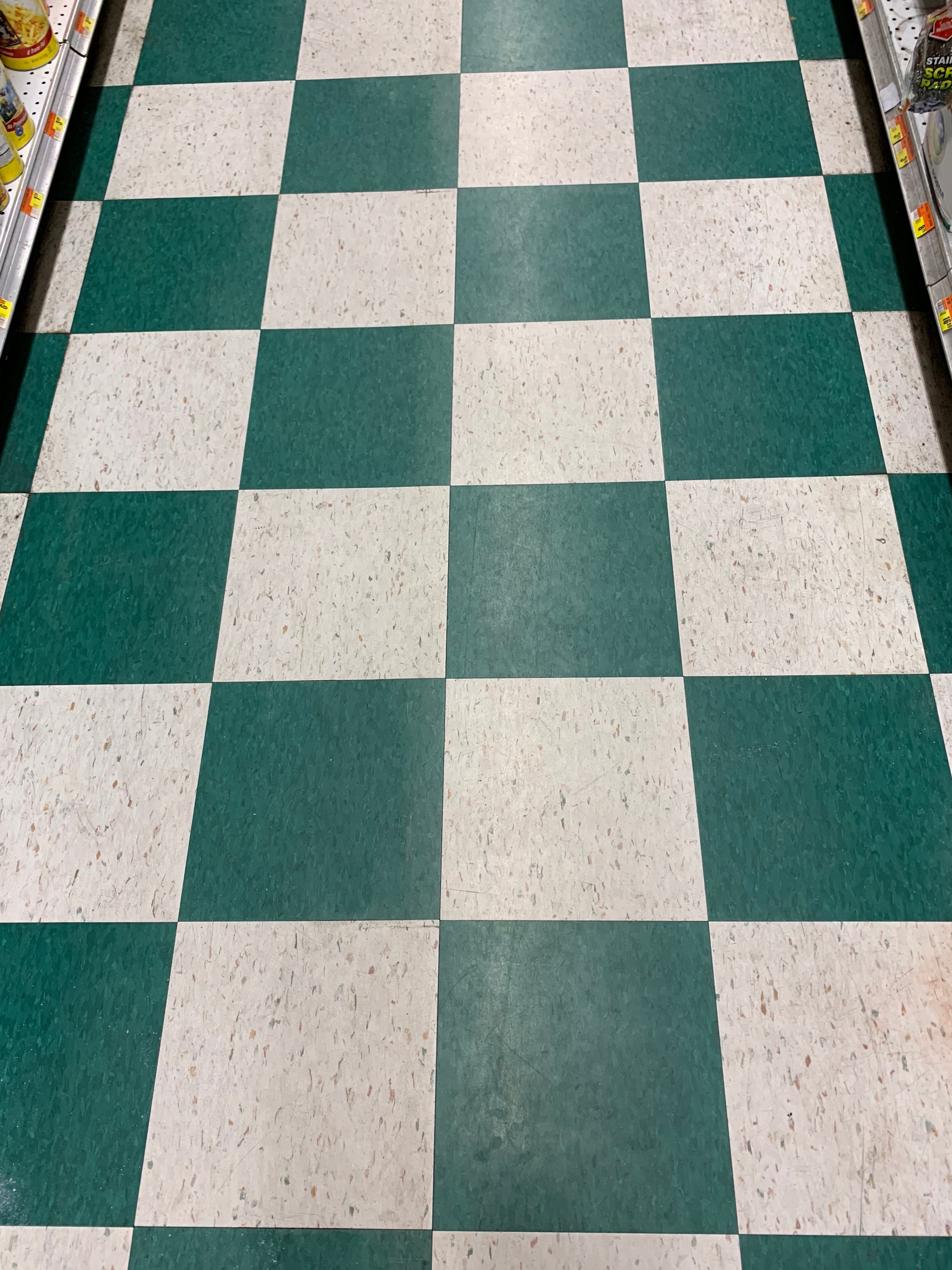
Vinyl floor tiling

Vinyl composition tile (VCT) is a finished flooring material used primarily in commercial and institutional applications. Modern vinyl floor tiles and sheet flooring and versions of those products sold since the early 1980s are composed of colored polyvinyl chloride (PVC) chips formed into solid sheets of varying thicknesses (1/8 in or 3.2 mm is most common) by heat and pressure. Floor tiles are cut into modular shapes such 12-by-12-inch (300 mm × 300 mm) squares or 12-by-24-inch (300 mm × 610 mm) rectangles. In installation the floor tiles or sheet flooring are applied to a smooth, leveled sub-floor using a specially formulated vinyl adhesive or tile mastic that remains pliable. In commercial applications some tiles are typically waxed and buffed using special materials and equipment.

Modern vinyl floor tile is frequently chosen for high-traffic areas because of its low cost, durability, and ease of maintenance. Vinyl tiles have high resilience to abrasion and impact damage and can be repeatedly refinished with chemical strippers and mechanical buffing equipment. If properly installed, tiles can be easily removed and replaced when damaged. Tiles are available in a variety of colors from several major flooring manufacturers. Some manufacturers have created vinyl tiles that very closely resemble wood, stone, terrazzo, and concrete and hundreds of varying patterns.

== History ==
In 1894, Philadelphia architect Frank Furness patented a system for rubber floor tiles. These tiles were durable, sound-deadening, easy to clean and easy to install. However, they stained easily and deteriorated over time from exposure to oxygen, ozone and solvents, and were not suitable for use in basements where alkaline moisture was present. In 1926, Waldo Semon, working in the United States, invented plasticized polyvinyl chloride. Polyvinyl chloride (PVC) is a plastic derived from vinyl chloride. Polyvinyl chloride (PVC) based floor coverings, commonly known as vinyls, made its big splash when a vinyl composition tile was displayed at the Century of Progress Exposition in Chicago. Because of the scarcity of vinyl during the war years, vinyl flooring was not widely marketed until the late 1940s, eventually became the most popular choice for flooring in just about any hard-surface application.

== Variations ==
=== Luxury vinyl (LVF, LVT, LVP, EVP) ===
"Luxury vinyl tile" (LVT) is an industry term, not a standard, for vinyl that realistically mimics the appearance of natural materials with an added layer to improve wear and performance. The extra layer of protection is usually a heavy film covered with a UV-cured urethane that makes it scuff, stain and scratch resistant. Sometimes the term "luxury vinyl tile" is reserved for products that mimic stone and ceramic, whereas the terms "luxury vinyl plank" (LVP) and "engineered vinyl plank" (EVP) are often used for products that mimic wood. "Luxury vinyl flooring" (LVF) is an umbrella term for these materials. LVP tends to be thicker than LVT, and LVP often has a click-lock system rather than adhesives that are often used with LVT.

=== PVC tiles ===
Polyvinyl chloride (PVC) tiles are a commonly used floor finish made from polyvinyl chloride. Due to the small size of the tiles, usually 150 mm (6"), 225 mm (9") and 305 mm (12"), any damage can soon be repaired by replacing individual tiles (as long as some spares are kept).

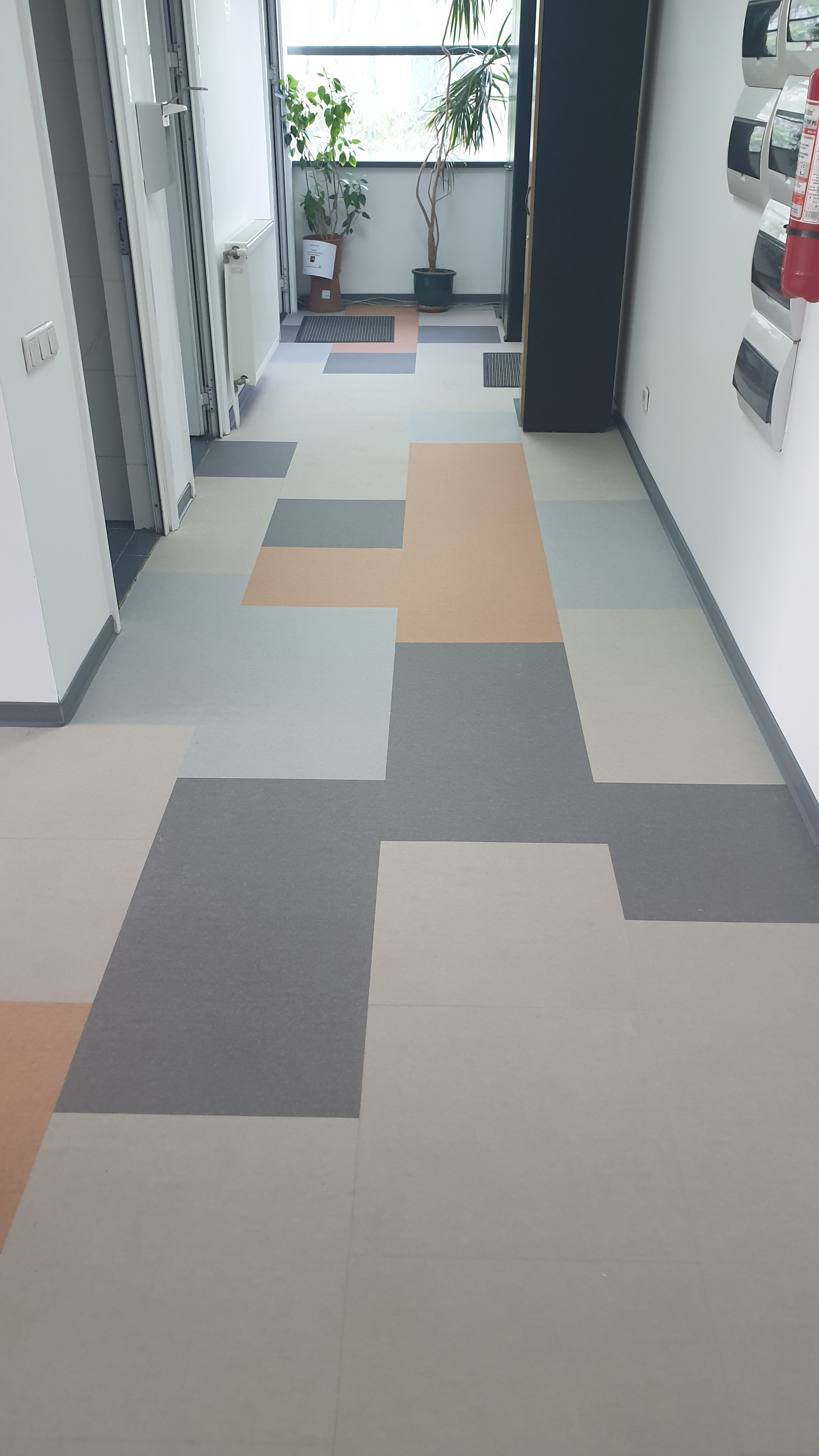
Vinyl floor covering in tiles, looselay installation, no glue

The tiles are made of a composite of PVC and fibre, producing a thin and fairly hard tile.

PVC tiles are prone to some issues. The glues used on self-adhesive tiles sometimes give way, causing edges to lift and get broken by foot traffic. The surface wears, in time causing difficulty in cleaning, then loss of the coloured pattern layer. Finally, a very smooth sub-floor is required to lay them on, otherwise they gradually become cut by the foot pressure above and the shallow edges below.

The main advantages of PVC tiles are low cost, ease of replacing individual tiles, and the fact that the tiles can be laid with only brief periods available. In fact, a DIYer with assorted ten-minute slots in otherwise busy days would have enough time to get a floor laid gradually, and thus could avoid professional installation costs.

== Concerns ==
=== Durability ===
When compared to more traditional flooring materials, such as tile and stone or wood, Luxury vinyl tiles tend to have lower durability and shorter useful lifespan. However, with the proper maintenance, LVP flooring can last for years. Regular cleaning, spill prevention, scratch protection, and moisture management all can maintain and extend the quality of LVP flooring.

=== Environmental Impacts ===
Recycling options for PVC are limited.

=== Asbestos health risk ===
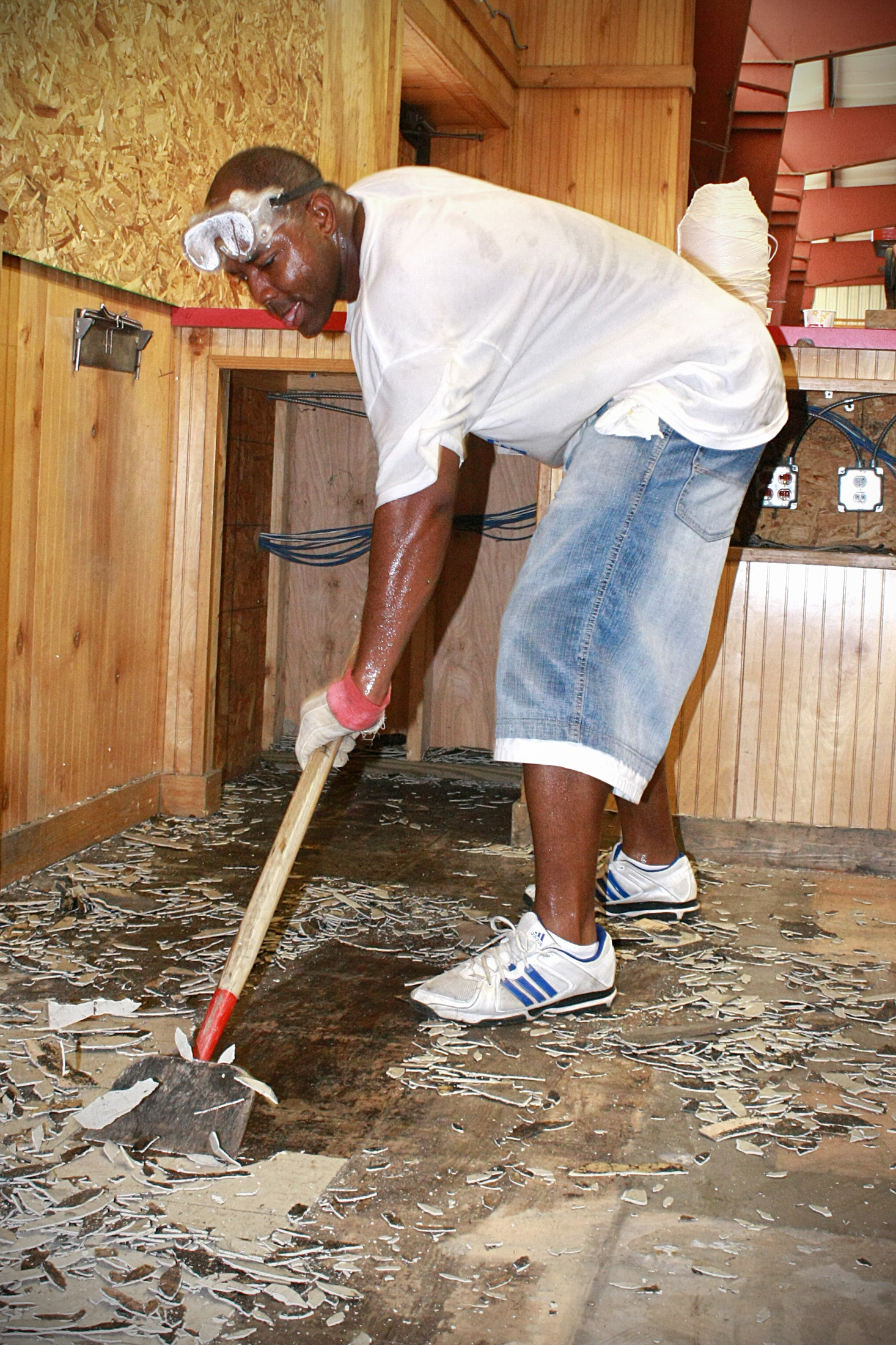
Removing thin 12 in × 12 in (300 mm × 300 mm) vinyl composition tiles

Vinyl tiles manufactured in the 20th century frequently contain asbestos fibers, which are today referred to as Vinyl-Asbestos Tiles (VAT). Asbestos fibers were added to vinyl tiles for their outstanding insulative properties, a desirable attribute in regions with cold winter weather. They also improved the tensile strength of vinyl tiles, increasing their service life.

An ASTM procedural textbook states that 42% of commercial and public buildings contain vinyl-asbestos floor tiles. 9×9 inch dimension tile almost always contains asbestos.

Although vinyl-asbestos floor tiles are not particularly dangerous when properly installed and undamaged, they should only be removed by trained professionals. There is a significant health risk posed by toxic dust dispersal during the removal of vinyl-asbestos tiles. Uncertified individuals should never attempt to remove floor tiles and should always seek to have their composition determined by a licensed professional.

A New York State ELAP certification manual states that "polarized light microscopy is not consistently reliable in detecting asbestos in floor coverings and similar non-friable organically bound materials".

== See also ==
- Polyvinyl chloride
- Resilient Floor Covering Institute
