= Sheet vinyl flooring =

Type of vinyl flooring

Sheet vinyl flooring is vinyl flooring that comes in large, continuous, flexible sheets. A vinyl sheet floor is completely impermeable to water, unlike vinyl floor tile, which comes in stiff tiles, and vinyl planks, which come in interlocking strips. It is sometimes called linoleum after a visually similar product of different (linseed oil) chemical composition.

Vinyl flooring is extensively used because it is water-impervious, fairly durable, adjustably resilient and insulating, easy to install, available with a variety of appearances, and inexpensive. Custom-print vinyl sheet flooring may cost an order of magnitude more, if ordered commercially,

However, vinyl flooring has environmental concerns in manufacturing, use, and disposal.

== Structure ==
The three basic categories of vinyl sheet flooring are homogeneous, inlaid, and layered composite. Vinyl flooring differs in manufacturing process and polyvinyl chloride content.

Composite manufacturing begins with a fibrous backing sheet. This was often felt or paper (before 1980, often with asbestos); more modernly, it is generally fiberglass. This sheet is coated in vinyl and plasticizer. The resulting sheet is printed and possibly embossed (the print layer). Then the sheet is coated again with one or more protective wear layers, the topmost of which may be polyurethane, to avoid waxing.

Cushioned vinyl sheet was developed in the 1960s. It features closed-cell-foam lower layers. A cushioned floor has more give and spring.

Low-VOC vinyl flooring is certified by the industry group Resilient Floor Covering Institute. However, it still emits volatile organic compounds such as phenol; ventilation may not appreciably lower concentrations.

== Durability and sustainability ==
Manufacture of polyvinyl chloride involves polymerizing vinyl chloride. Vinyl chloride is a known carcinogen and has other negative health effects. Its escape into the environment is a concern. Other ingredients in vinyl flooring vary widely, and some are harmful.

The thickness of the sheet and the wear layer determines the durability of the floor; unlike linoleum, vinyl flooring is usually not homogeneous, and once it wears through the print layer, it will be obviously damaged. Thinner floors may also tear. While it is possible to wax or otherwise resurface vinyl floors, it is not often done.

Vinyl floors can be recycled, but currently almost never are. They are landfilled rather than used as raw materials in a closed loop. Vinyl floor's life cycle environmental impact is worse than that of linoleum.

Landfilled vinyl can leach phthalates (commonly added to flooring for flexibility).

Incinerated vinyl produces polychlorinated dibenzodioxins (PCDDs) and polychlorinated dibenzofurans (PCDFs), dioxins, and other toxic chemicals. It can produce polychlorinated biphenyls (PCBs) and polycyclic aromatic hydrocarbons (PAHs), especially at higher temperatures.

== Fire risks ==
Vinyl flooring decomposes and releases toxic gasses, mostly hydrogen chloride, long before bursting into flames. This can kill fire victims and firefighters working without a SCBA. Vinyl fires are also hard to extinguish, due to the impermeability of vinyl.

== Functions ==
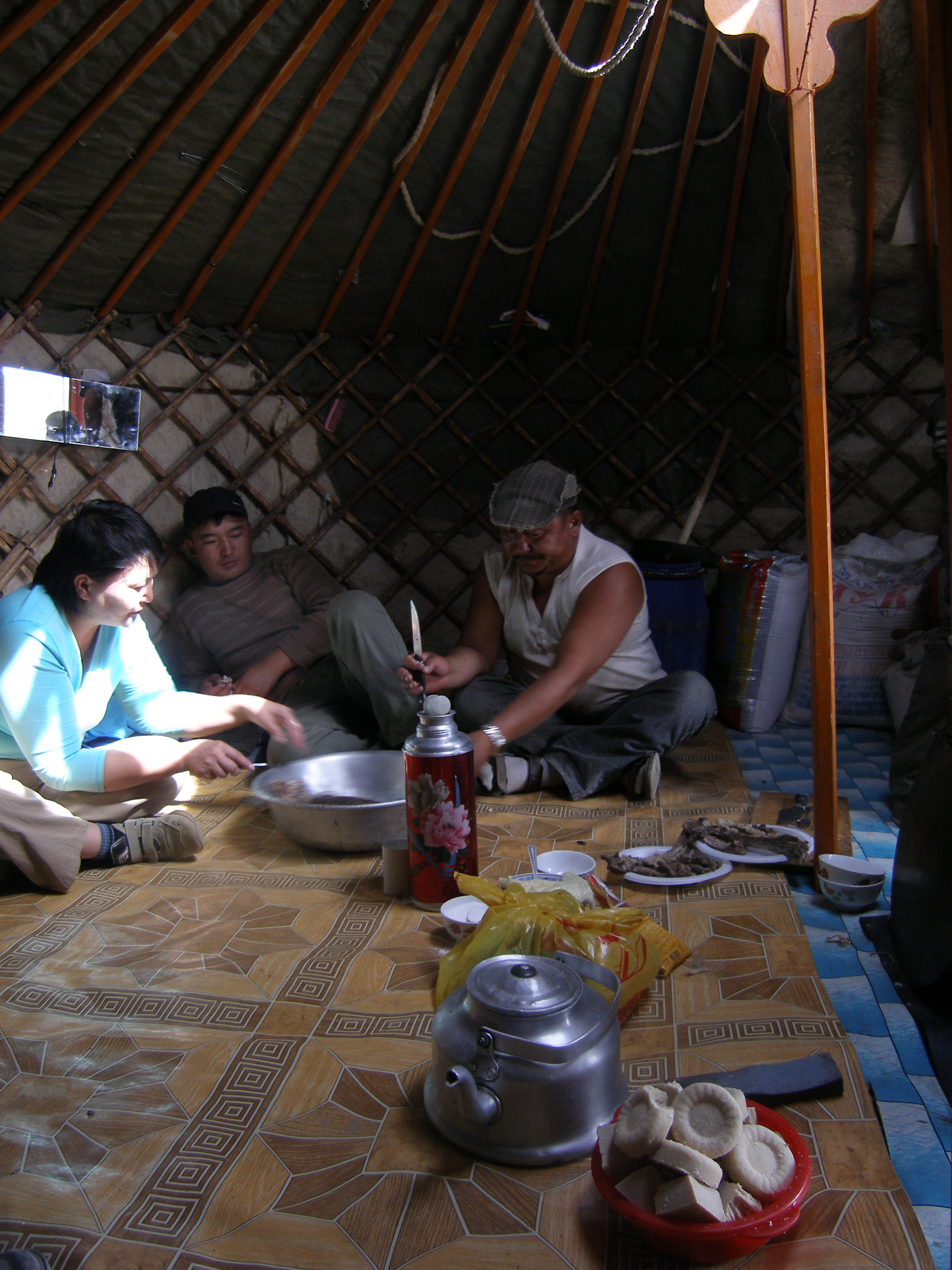
Two contrasting sheets of vinyl flooring used in a food-preparation area in a Mongolian ger (yurt). Stove on the right.

As it does not let water through, sheet flooring is suitable for kitchens and bathrooms. Some types can be used in wet rooms.

Because the closed-cell foam backing of vinyl sheet can be varied, it can be given the resilience profile of sprung performance floor, suitable as a sports or dance floor. It can make a permanent or portable dance floor which can be laid on problematic surfaces such as concrete.

Some sheet vinyl flooring can be used outside.

== Installation ==
Sheet vinyl flooring should be allowed to rest in the room it will be installed in, to avoid having to make multiple cuts as it relaxes. Any unevennesses in the subfloor will show through the sheet flooring, so they must be smoothed in advance.

Bathtub floors may join the sheet flooring to the wall after bending it up the wall like skirting-board. As the vinyl is impervious, they help avoid water infiltration into the subfloor, and are most common in wetrooms. Sheet flooring may also be used with conventional skirting board, in imitation of rigid flooring. A concealed bathtub floor may be hidden behind skirting board (if the lower part of the back of the skirting board is cut away) or under a built-in cabinet. This also decreases the precision with which the sheet must be cut.

The flooring may be glued down over its entire area, glued down only around the edges, or unglued, depending on the area. Depending on the size of the room and sheet, seams may need to be sealed. Vinyl flooring may also be sealed to a waterproof wall surface to make a wetroom.

Hot air weld guns with plastic welding rods are often used to fix vinyl flooring in place. This is done by feeding a welding rod into the weld gun nozzle and heating the vinyl and the welding rod along the gap between two vinyl tiles.

Cross-section contrasting, left, a conventional floor; center, a bathtub floor of the sort used for wetrooms, with an impermeable sheet floor sealed (in red) to an impermeable wall covering; right, a concealed bathtub floor

== Appearance ==
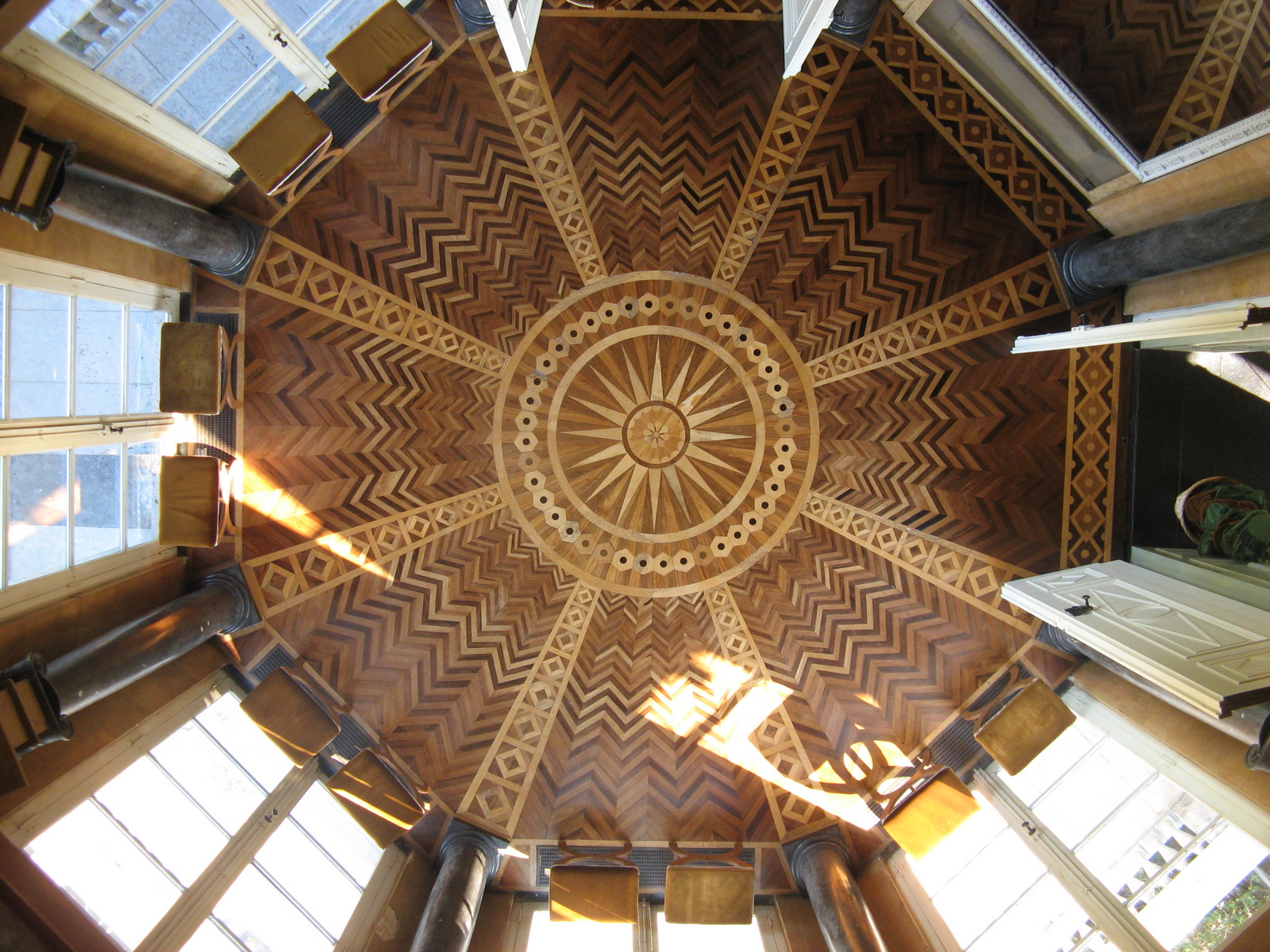
This parquet floor is fitted to the size and shape of the room. This is only possible with sheet vinyl if it is custom-printed.

Vinyl sheet flooring is usually made with skeuomorphic patterns that imitate wood, stone, or tile. The texture of these materials is imitated using embossing and specific top coats; the appearance is duplicated using a print layer. Recent improvements in printing technology have made for higher-resolution images.

A minority of sheet vinyl is printed with non-skeuomorphic designs; these may be drawn images resembling carpet patterns, or be photographic images such as rippled water, sand, or nebula images.

Printable sheet vinyl flooring is now also available; it can be custom-printed by the manufacturer with any image file. This allows customization of the pattern to the dimensions of the room, and can include cutting lines for easy installation.
