= 1,1'-Azobis-1,2,3-triazole =

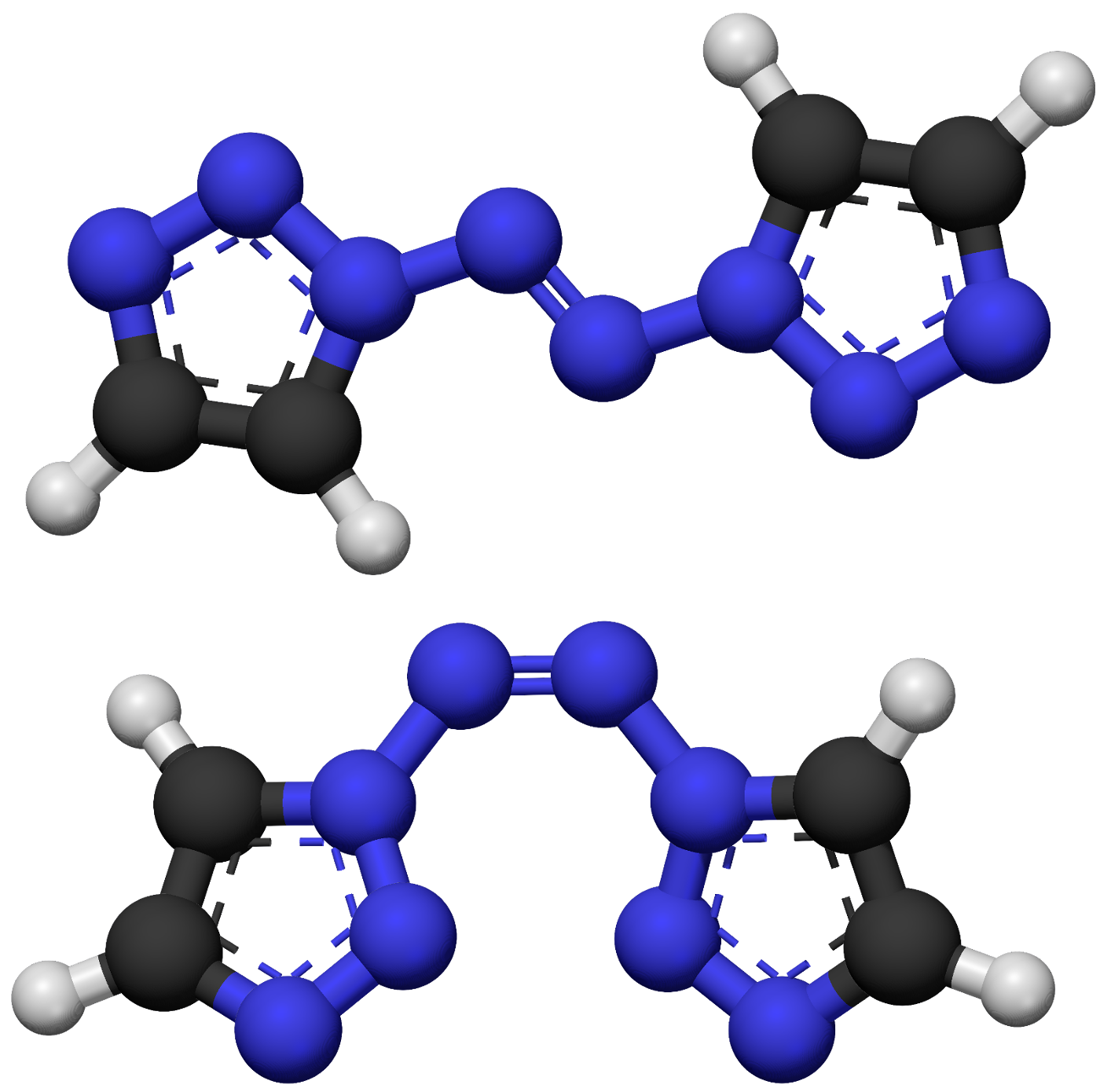
- trans-1,1'-Azobis-1,2,3-triazole (on top) cis-1,1'-Azobis-1,2,3-triazole (on bottom) Carbon, C Hydrogen, H Nitrogen, N

Names
- Preferred IUPAC name 1,1′-Diazenediyldi(1H-1,2,3-triazole)

Identifiers
CAS Number	1354420-07-7
3D model (JSmol)	Interactive image
ChemSpider	26234930; 26234931
PubChem CID	71308130
UNII	M7A5U2N4ZU
- InChI: InChI=1S/C4H4N8/c1-3-11(7-5-1)9-10-12-4-2-6-8-12/h1-4H/b10-9+ Key: WUPZAQSKRMYJNB-MDZDMXLPSA-N
- SMILES: c2cnnn2\N=N\n1ccnn1

Properties
Chemical formula	C_{4}H_{4}N_{8}
Molar mass	164.132 g·mol^{−1}
Appearance	Blue (cis isomer); Yellow (trans isomer)

Hazards
- Occupational safety and health (OHS/OSH)
Main hazards	Explosive
- Except where otherwise noted, data are given for materials in their standard state (at 25 °C [77 °F], 100 kPa). verify (what is ?) Infobox references

1,1'-Azobis-1,2,3-triazole is a moderately explosive but comparatively stable chemical compound which contains a long continuous chain of nitrogen atoms, with an unbroken chain of eight nitrogen atoms cyclised into two 1,2,3-triazole rings. It is stable up to 194 °C. The compound exhibits cis–trans isomerism at the central azo group: the trans isomer is more stable and is yellow, while the cis isomer is less stable and is blue. The two rings are aromatic and form a conjugated system with the azo linkage. This chromophore allows the trans compound to be isomerised to the cis when treated with an appropriate wavelength of ultraviolet light.

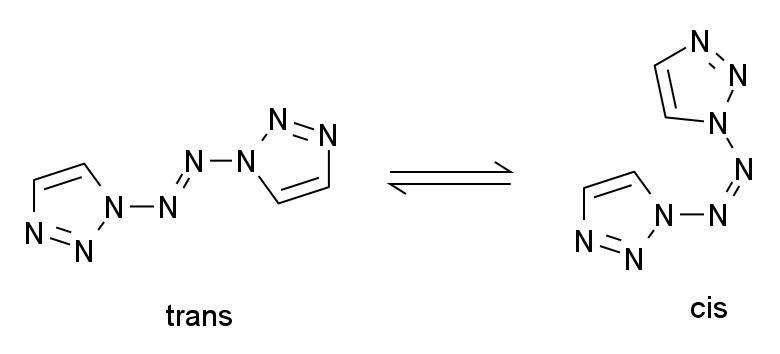

== Related compounds ==
In 2011, 1,1'-azobis(1,2,3,4-tetrazole) with formula C_{2}H_{2}N_{10} was prepared by Klapötke and Piercey which has a 10-nitrogen chain. The record was later taken by a 11-nitrogen chain compound synthesized by a group of Chinese researchers. A branched chain of 11-nitrogen system has also been reported as part of an unstable but highly nitrogen rich azidotetrazole derivative with formula C_{2}N_{14}.

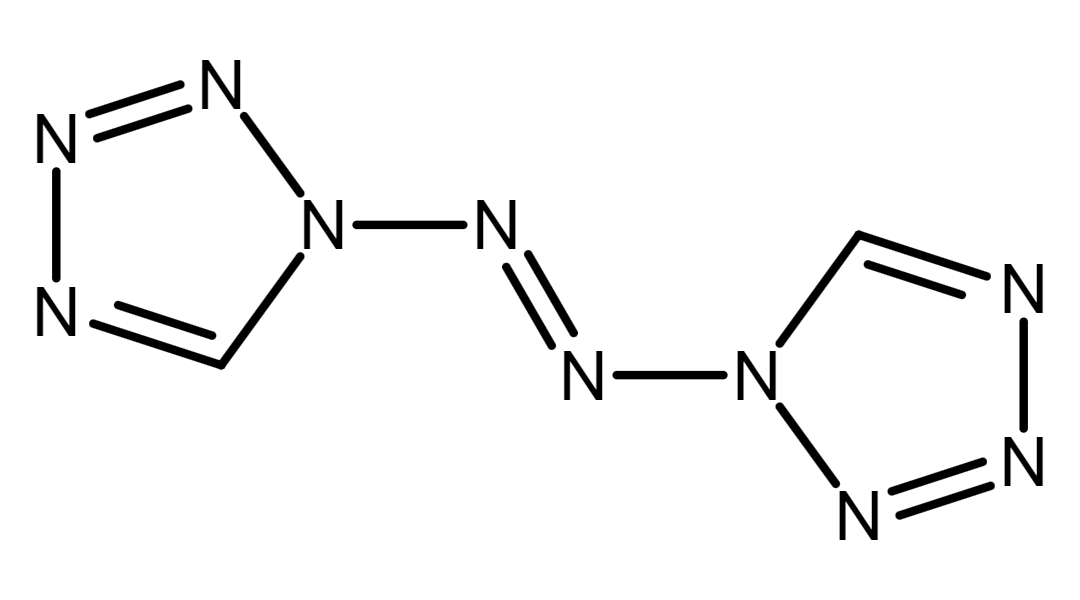
1,1′-Azobis(1,2,3,4-tetrazole) (trans isomer)

== See also ==
- HBT (explosive)
- G2ZT
- Diazene
- TKX-50
