= 1,1'-Azobis(1,2,3,4-tetrazole) =

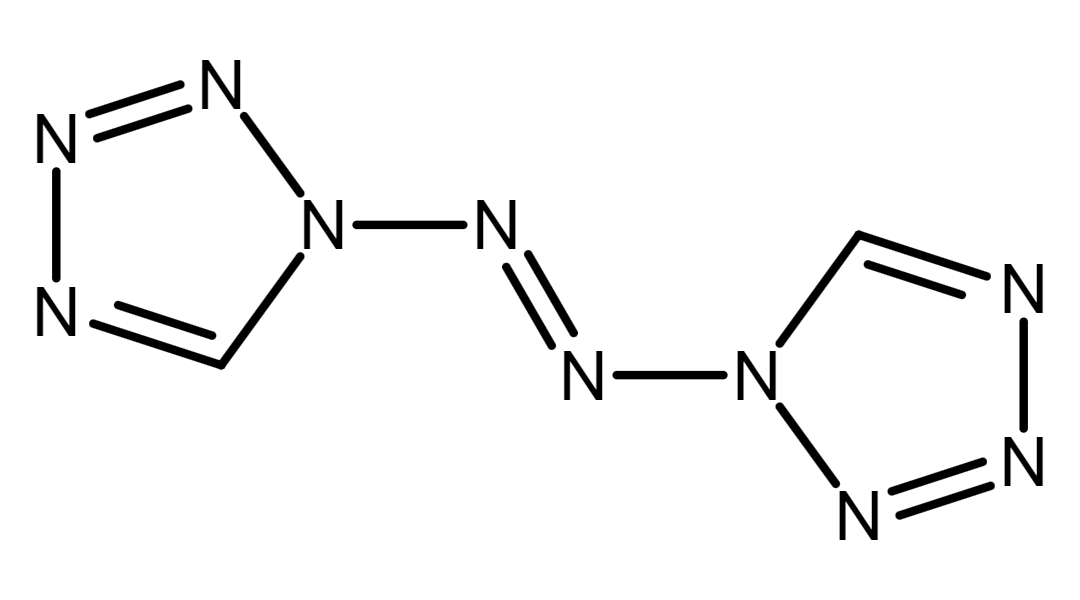

Names
- Preferred IUPAC name 1,1′-Diazenediyldi(1H-tetrazole)

Identifiers
| CAS Number | 1282522-34-2 |
| 3D model (JSmol) | Interactive image |
| PubChem CID | 69817332 |
- InChI: InChI=1S/C2H2N10/c1-3-5-7-11(1)9-10-12-2-4-6-8-12/h1-2H Key: SETQWLRMPKPJQM-UHFFFAOYSA-N
- SMILES: C1=NN=NN1N=NN2C=NN=N2

Properties
| Chemical formula | C_{2}H_{2}N_{10} |
| Molar mass | 166.108 g·mol^{−1} |
| Appearance | yellow (cis isomer) white (trans isomer) |
| Density | 1.774 |

Hazards
- Occupational safety and health (OHS/OSH)
| Main hazards | shock-sensitive explosive |
- Except where otherwise noted, data are given for materials in their standard state (at 25 °C [77 °F], 100 kPa). verify (what is ?) Infobox references

1,1'-Azobis(1,2,3,4-tetrazole) is a highly explosive and unstable chemical compound discovered by Thomas M. Klapötke and Davin G. Piercey at LMU Munich which contains a long continuous chain of nitrogen atoms, with an unbroken chain of ten nitrogen atoms contained within two 1,2,3,4-tetrazole rings and an azo bridge. It is related to 1,1'-azobis-1,2,3-triazole which has a similar structure but with an 8 nitrogen atom chain through the replacement of two N atoms with C-H groups. It is stable only up to 80 °C and is reported to be one of the most sensitive explosives in existence.

we experienced several inadvertent explosions during handling such as allowing the dry powder to slide down the inside of a Raman tube or slowing down the rotation rate of a rotary evaporator as 4 crystallized. The material demands the utmost care in handling, and the sensitivities were well below the measurable limit (<5 N friction and <1 J impact) of our safety characterization equipment; the material violently explodes when impacted with a 150 g hammer at 2 cm (∼0.03 J). It is among the most sensitive materials that we have handled

— Klapötke and Piercey

The ten-nitrogen chain was the record for the longest continuous chain of nitrogen atoms in a chemical compound until Chinese researchers prepared a compound with an 11-nitrogen chain. It is too sensitive to be used as a practical explosive and is more sensitive than 1-diazidocarbamoyl-5-azidotetrazole which is often erroneously reported as the most sensitive explosive. Cis‐trans isomerization occurs under UV light exposure.

== Synthesis ==
It is synthesized from N-aminotetrazole via an azo-coupling reaction using sodium dichloroisocyanurate in acetic acid.

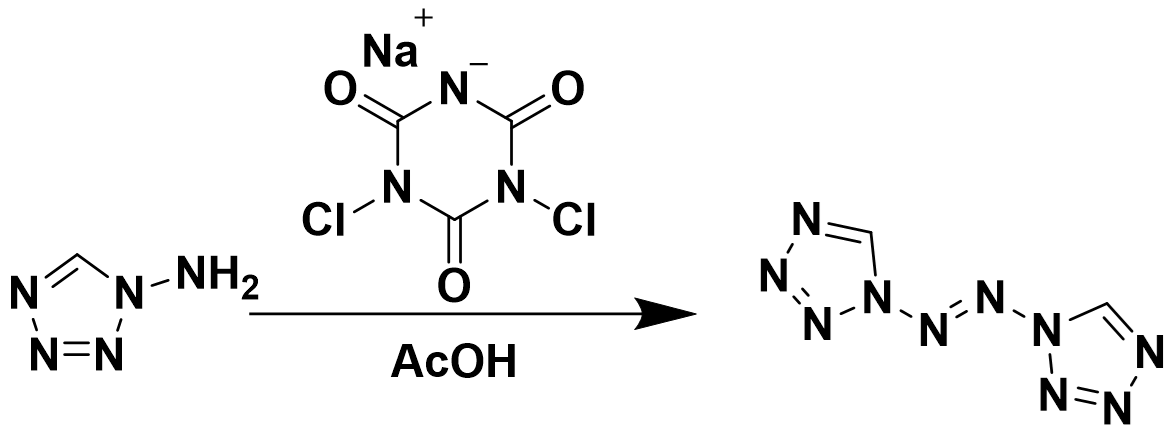
1,1'-azobis(tetrazole) synthesis

== See also ==
- HBT (explosive)
- 1-Diazidocarbamoyl-5-azidotetrazole
- 1,1'-Azobis-1,2,3-triazole
- Diazene
- TKX-50
