= Arsenic triazide =

Names
- Other names: Arsenic(III) azide; Arsorous triazide

Identifiers
CAS Number	167771-41-7
3D model (JSmol)	Interactive image
ChemSpider	28548488
PubChem CID	15768782
CompTox Dashboard (EPA)	DTXSID10578149
- InChI: Key: JSQMYNXMPBYXOR-UHFFFAOYSA-N; InChI=1S/AsN9/c2-8-5-1(6-9-3)7-10-4
- SMILES: [N-]=[N+]=N[As](N=[N+]=[N-])N=[N+]=[N-]

Properties
Chemical formula	As(N_{3})_{3}
Molar mass	200.98 g/mol
Appearance	White solid
Density	2.33 g/cm^{3}
Melting point	37 °C (99 °F; 310 K)
Boiling point	62 °C (144 °F; 335 K) (decomposition)
Solubility in water	Reacts

Structure
Crystal structure	Monoclinic
Space group	P2_{1}/c
Point group	C_{s}
Lattice constant	a = 7.33 Å, b = 11.72 Å, c = 6.99 Å α = 90°, β = 107.2°, γ = 90°
Lattice volume (V)	572.8 Å^{3}
Coordination geometry	Tetrahedral (gas phase)
Molecular shape	Trigonal pyramidal (gas phase)

Related compounds
Other cations	Phosphorus triazide Antimony triazide
- Except where otherwise noted, data are given for materials in their standard state (at 25 °C [77 °F], 100 kPa). Infobox references

Arsenic triazide is an inorganic chemical compound with the formula As(N_{3})_{3}. It is a toxic, shock-sensitive, and friction-sensitive white solid that melts at 37 °C and explodes on further heating. Due to its toxicity and sensitivity, it has no commercial uses.

== Synthesis and structure ==
Arsenic triazide was first synthesized by Thomas M. Klapötke in 1995 by the reaction of arsenic trichloride and sodium azide in trichlorofluoromethane at 0 °C:

AsCl_{3} + 3 NaN_{3} → As(N_{3})_{3} + 3 NaCl

A purer product was obtained by another synthesis route by Karl O. Christe in 2004 by the reaction of arsenic trifluoride and trimethylsilyl azide.

Both in the gas and solid phase, arsenic triazide adopts a trigonal pyramidal geometry around the arsenic atom with a bond angle of 88.3°; this low bond angle is attributed to the major p-character of the bonding orbitals. The point group is C_{3}, meaning that the azide groups are not equivalent. However, in the solid phase, arsenic triazide attains a coordination number of 7, different from the gas phase, which has a coordination number of 4.

== Complexes ==
Related azido arsenic(III) complexes are known, such as the tetraazidoarsenate(III) anion (As(N_{3})_{4}^{–}), which is found in tetramethylammonium tetraazidoarsenate(III).
