= Glycine (disambiguation) =

Glycine is an amino acid with the chemical formula NH_{2}CH_{2}COOH.

- Glycine (data page)

Glycine may also refer to:

- Glycine (plant), a genus of plants in the bean family
- Glycine Watch SA, a Swiss watchmaker

== See also ==
- Glycin, a photographic developing agent
