= ATZ =

ATZ may refer to:

- Aerodrome Traffic Zone (ATZ)
  - Military Aerodrome Traffic Zone (MATZ)
- IATA code of Assiut Airport
- Automobiltechnische Zeitschrift
- 5-Aminotetrazole
