= Ernst Schering =

Ernst Schering may refer to:

- Ernst Christian Friedrich Schering (1824–1889), German apothecary and industrialist who created the Schering Corporation
- Ernst Christian Julius Schering (1833–1897), German mathematician from Göttingen
