= HBT (explosive) =

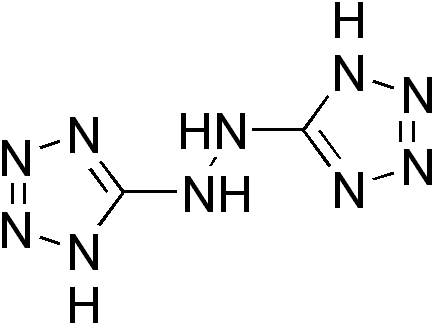
- Skeletal formula of a minor tautomer of HBT

Names
- IUPAC name N,N'-Bis-(1H-tetrazol-5-yl)-hydrazine
- Other names 1,2-Ditetrazolylhydrazine 5,5'-Hydrazinebistetrazole BTH

Identifiers
CAS Number	74999-19-2
3D model (JSmol)	Interactive image; Interactive image; Interactive image
ChemSpider	127666
PubChem CID	144703
UNII	VK5EF2THH6
CompTox Dashboard (EPA)	DTXSID60225954
- InChI: InChI=1S/C2H4N10/c3(1-5-9-10-6-1)4-2-7-11-12-8-2/h(H2,3,5,6,9,10)(H2,4,7,8,11,12) Key: KOVNXYJOKSNDJA-UHFFFAOYSA-N
- SMILES: N(Nc1nn[nH]n1)c1nn[nH]n1; N(NC1=NNN=N1)C1=NNN=N1; C1(NNC2=NN=NN2)=NN=NN1

Properties
Chemical formula	C_{2}H_{4}N_{10}
Molar mass	168.124 g·mol^{−1}
Density	2.327 g cm^{−3}
- Except where otherwise noted, data are given for materials in their standard state (at 25 °C [77 °F], 100 kPa). verify (what is ?) Infobox references

HBT is a bistetrazole. It is an explosive approximately as powerful as HMX or CL-20, but it releases biodegradable products when detonated: ammonia and hydrogen cyanide. When combined with ADN or AN oxidizers, the amount of hydrogen cyanide produced may be reduced. The compound is thus considered by its advocates to be a more environmentally friendly explosive than traditional nitroamine-based explosives.

== See also ==
- 1,1'-Azobis-1,2,3-triazole
- G2ZT
