= Pentazenium tetraazidoborate =

Names
- Other names Pentanitrogen tetraazidoborate

Identifiers
3D model (JSmol)	Interactive image
- InChI: InChI=1S/BN12.N5/c2-10-6-1(7-11-3,8-12-4)9-13-5;1-3-5-4-2/q-1;+1 Key: OFPGSIWCLXGVQI-UHFFFAOYSA-N
- SMILES: [N-]=[N+]=N[N+]#N.[B-](N=[N+]=[N-])(N=[N+]=[N-])(N=[N+]=[N-])N=[N+]=[N-]

Properties
Chemical formula	BN_{17}
Molar mass	248.92 g/mol
Appearance	White solid
Melting point	−63 °C (−81 °F; 210 K) (decomposes)
Solubility	Soluble in sulfur dioxide

Explosive data
Detonation velocity	Very high
- Except where otherwise noted, data are given for materials in their standard state (at 25 °C [77 °F], 100 kPa). Infobox references

Pentazenium tetraazidoborate is an extremely unstable chemical compound with the formula N_{5}[B(N_{3})_{4}]. It is a white solid that violently explodes at room temperature. This compound has a 95.7% nitrogen content which is the second highest known of a chemical compound, exceeding even that of ammonium azide (93.3%) and 1-diazidocarbamoyl-5-azidotetrazole (89.1%), being surpassed only by hydrazoic acid (97.7%).

== Production and properties ==
The production of N_{5}[B(N_{3})_{4}] requires a multi-step synthesis, first, hydrazoic acid and sodium borohydride is reacted in diethyl ether at -78 °C to produce sodium tetraazidoborate (which decomposes at 76 °C):

NaBH_{4} + 4HN_{3} → Na[B(N_{3})_{4}] + 4H_{2}

The other reactant, pentazenium hexafluoroantimonate, its produced by the reaction of N_{2}F^{+} and antimony(V) fluoride. Then, two reactants that are produced are mixed at -64 °C under sulfur dioxide:

Na[B(N_{3})_{4}] + N_{5}SbF_{6} → N_{5}[B(N_{3})_{4}] + NaSbF_{6}↓

to produce the pentazenium tetraazidoborate. If heated, it decomposes into nitrogen gas and boron triazide; the boron triazide further decomposes into boron nitride and nitrogen. The overall reaction is the following:

N_{5}[B(N_{3})_{4}] → 8N_{2} + BN

The compound is extremely sensitive; an attempted Raman spectroscopy of a 500 mg sample of the compound resulted in an explosion.
