= Pentazenium =

Polytomic cation (N–N–N–N–N)

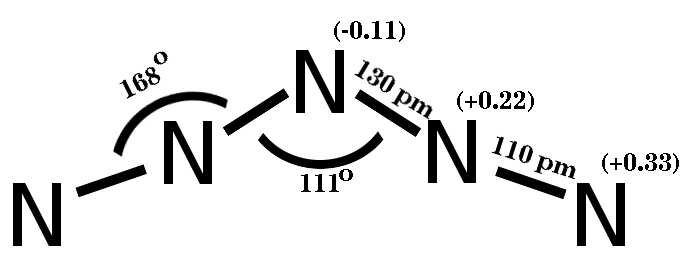
- Skeletal formula of pentazenium with assorted dimensions

Names
- Other names Pentanitrogen cation

Identifiers
CAS Number	236412-64-9; 12596-65-5
3D model (JSmol)	Interactive image
PubChem CID	139031002
- InChI: InChI=1S/N5/c1-3-5-4-2/q+1 Key: UXGCMSPHSBEHRM-UHFFFAOYSA-N
- SMILES: N#[N+][N-][N+]#N

Properties
Chemical formula	N^{+}_{5}
Molar mass	70.0335 g/mol
- Except where otherwise noted, data are given for materials in their standard state (at 25 °C [77 °F], 100 kPa). verify (what is ?) Infobox references

In chemistry, the pentazenium cation (also known as pentanitrogen) is a positively-charged polyatomic ion with the chemical formula N^{+}_{5} and structure N−N−N−N−N. Together with solid nitrogen polymers and the azide anion, it is one of only three poly-nitrogen species obtained in bulk quantities.

== History ==
Within the High Energy Density Matter research program, run by the U.S. Air Force since 1986, systematic attempts to approach polynitrogen compounds began in 1998, when Air Force Research Laboratory at Edwards AFB became interested in researching alternatives to the highly toxic hydrazine-based rocket fuel and simultaneously funded several such proposals. Karl O. Christe, then, a senior investigator at AFRL, chose to attempt building linear N^{+}_{5} out of N_{2}F^{+} and N^{−}_{3}, based on the proposed bond structure:

[F−N≡N]^{+} + H−N=N^{+}=N^{−} → [N≡N−N=N=N]^{+} + HF

The reaction succeeded, and [N_{5}]^{+}[AsF_{6}]^{−} was created in sufficient quantities to be fully characterized by NMR, IR and Raman spectroscopy in 1999. The salt was highly explosive, but when AsF_{5} was replaced by SbF_{5}, a stronger Lewis acid, much more stable [N_{5}]^{+}[SbF_{6}]^{−} was produced, shock-resistant and thermally stable up to 60–70 °C. This made bulk quantities, easy handling, and X-ray crystal structure analysis possible.

The existence of N^{+}_{5} was predicted using ab initio calculations as a member of the dicyanamide isoelectronic series by Pyykkö and Runeberg in 1991.

== Preparation ==
Reaction of N_{2}F^{+} and HN_{3} in dry HF at −78 °C is the only known method so far:

cis-N_{2}F_{2} + SbF_{5} → [N_{2}F]^{+}[SbF_{6}]^{−}
[N_{2}F]^{+}[SbF_{6}]^{−} + HN_{3} → [N_{5}]^{+}[SbF_{6}]^{−} + HF

== Chemistry ==
N^{+}_{5} is capable of oxidizing water, NO, NO_{2} and Br_{2}, but not Cl_{2} or O_{2}; its electron affinity is 10.44 eV (1018.4 kJ/mol). For this reason, N^{+}_{5} must be prepared and handled in a dry environment:

4 N^{+}_{5} + 2 H_{2}O → 4 H^{+} + 10 N_{2} + O_{2}
2 [N_{5}]^{+}[SbF_{6}]^{−} + 2 Br_{2} → 2 [Br_{2}]^{+}[SbF_{6}]^{−} + 5 N_{2}

Due to stability of the fluoroantimonate, it is used as the precursor for all other known salts, typically accomplished by metathesis reactions in non-aqueous solvents such as HF, SO_{2}, CHF_{3}, or CH_{3}CN, where suitable hexafluoroantimonates are insoluble:

[N_{5}]^{+}[SbF_{6}]^{−} + A^{+}B^{−} → [N_{5}]^{+}B^{−} + A^{+}[SbF_{6}]^{−}

The most stable salts of N^{+}_{5} decompose when heated to 50–60 °C: [N_{5}]^{+}[SbF_{6}]^{−}, [N_{5}]^{+}[SnF_{5}]^{−}, and [N_{5}]^{+}[B(CF_{3})_{4}]^{−}, while the most unstable salts that were obtained and studied, [N_{5}]^{+}[P(N_{3})_{6}]^{−} and [N_{5}]^{+}[B(N_{3})_{4}]^{−} were extremely shock and temperature sensitive, exploding in solutions as dilute as 0.5 mmol. A number of salts, such as fluoride, azide, nitrate, or perchlorate, cannot be formed.

== Structure and bonding ==
In valence bond theory, pentazenium can be described by six resonance structures:

[N≡N^{+}−N^{−}−N^{+}≡N] ↔ [N^{−}=N^{+}=N−N^{+}≡N] ↔ [N≡N^{+}−N=N^{+}=N^{−}] ↔ [N≡N^{+}−N^{+}≡N^{+}−N^{2−}] ↔ [N^{2−}−N^{+}≡N^{+}−N^{+}≡N] ↔ [N^{−}=N^{+}=N^{+}=N^{+}=N^{−}],

where the last three structures have smaller contributions to the overall structure because they have less favorable formal charge states than the first three.

According to both ab initio calculations and the experimental X-ray structure, the cation is planar, symmetric, and approximately V-shaped, with bond angles 111° at the central atom (angle N2–N3–N4) and 168° at the second and fourth atoms (angles N1–N2–N3 and N3–N4–N5). The bond lengths for N1–N2 and N4–N5 are 1.10 Å and the bond lengths N2–N3 and N3–N4 are 1.30 Å.

== See also ==
- Pentazole
- Pentazolate (cyclo-N^{−}_{5})
- Azide
- Pentazenium tetraazidoborate
