= Glycine =

Amino acid

Skeletal formula of neutral glycine
Skeletal formula of zwitterionic glycine
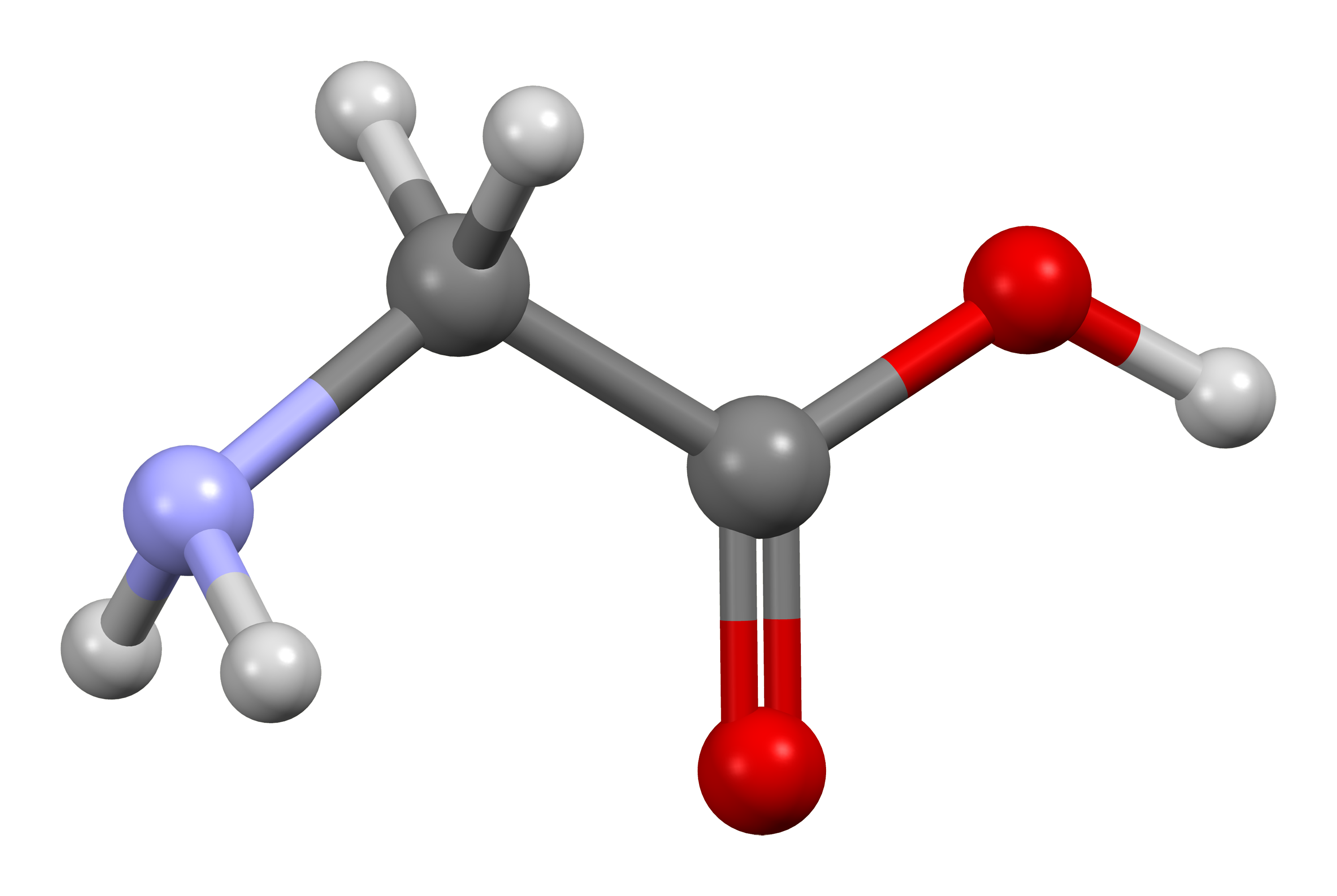
Ball-and-stick model of the gas-phase structure
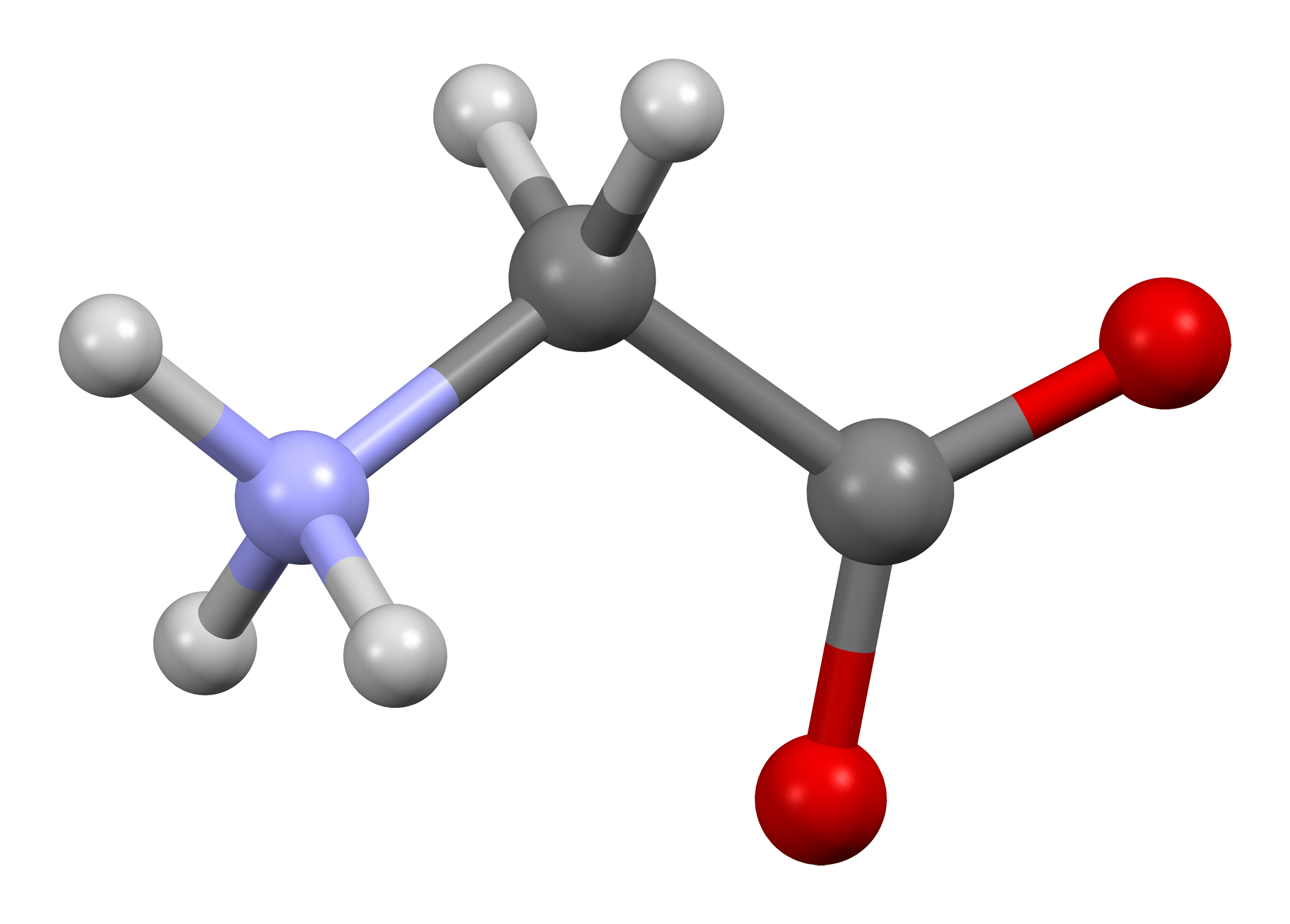
Ball-and-stick model of the zwitterionic solid-state structure
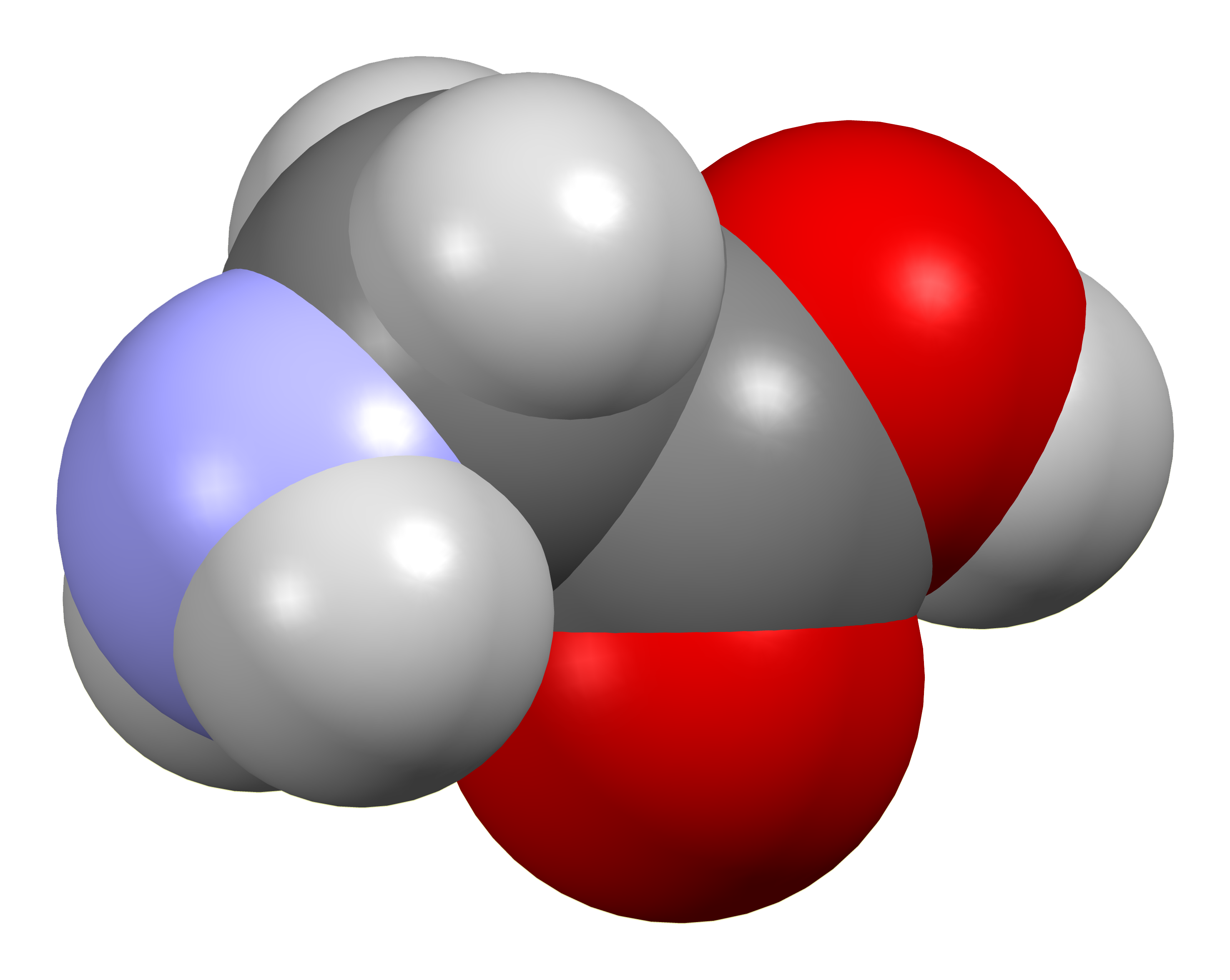
Space-filling model of the gas-phase structure
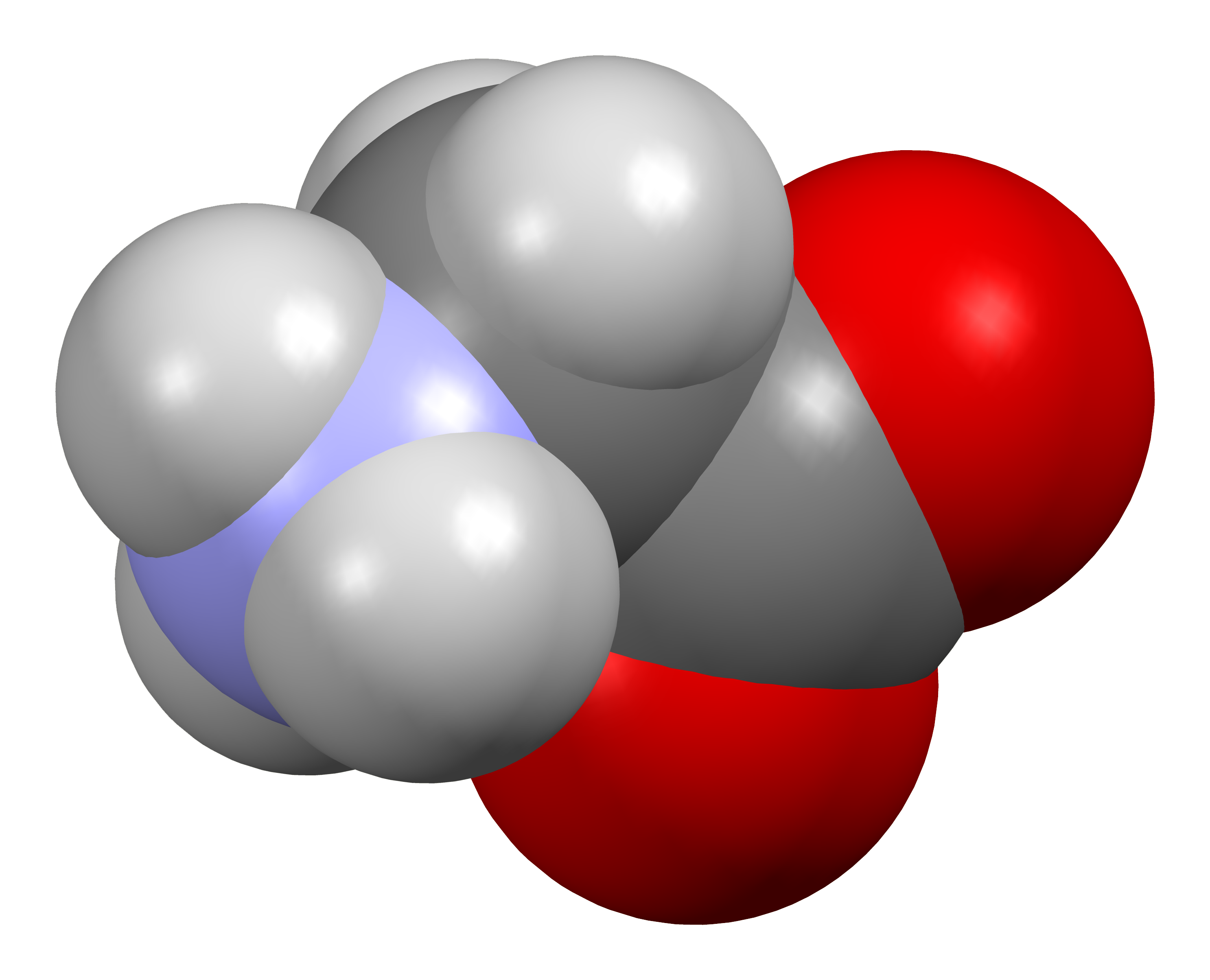
Space-filling model of the zwitterionic solid-state structure

Names
- IUPAC name Glycine
- Systematic IUPAC name Aminoacetic acid
- Other names: 2-Aminoethanoic acid; Glycocol; Glycic acid; Dicarbamic acid

Identifiers
CAS Number	56-40-6; 6000-43-7 (HCl salt)
3D model (JSmol)	Interactive image; Zwitterion: Interactive image; Interactive image
Abbreviations	Gly, G
ChEBI	CHEBI:15428
ChEMBL	ChEMBL773
ChemSpider	730; 20944
DrugBank	DB00145
ECHA InfoCard	100.000.248
EC Number	200-272-2; 227-841-8
E number	E640 (flavour enhancer)
IUPHAR/BPS	727
KEGG	D00011
PubChem CID	750; 22316
UNII	TE7660XO1C; 225ZLC74HX
CompTox Dashboard (EPA)	DTXSID9020667
- InChI: InChI=1S/C2H5NH2/c3-1-2(4)5/h1,3H2,(H,4,5) Key: DHMQDGOQFOQNFH-UHFFFAOYSA-N; InChI=1S/C2H5NO2/c3-1-2(4)5/h1,3H2,(H,4,5) Key: DHMQDGOQFOQNFH-UHFFFAOYAW
- SMILES: C(C(=O)O)N; Zwitterion: C(C(=O)[O-])[NH3+]; C(C(=O)O)N.Cl

Properties
Chemical formula	C_{2}H_{5}NO_{2}
Molar mass	75.067 g·mol^{−1}
Appearance	White solid
Density	1.1607 g/cm^{3}
Melting point	233 °C (451 °F; 506 K) (decomposition)
Solubility in water	249.9 g/L (25 °C)
Solubility	soluble in pyridine sparingly soluble in ethanol insoluble in ether
Acidity (pK_{a})	2.34 (carboxyl), 9.6 (amino)
Magnetic susceptibility (χ)	−40.3·10^{−6} cm^{3}/mol

Pharmacology
ATC code	B05CX03 (WHO)

Hazards
- Lethal dose or concentration (LD, LC)
LD_{50} (median dose)	2600 mg/kg (mouse, oral)

Supplementary data page
- Glycine (data page)
- Except where otherwise noted, data are given for materials in their standard state (at 25 °C [77 °F], 100 kPa). verify (what is ?) Infobox references

Glycine ball and stick model spinning

Glycine (symbol Gly or G; /ˈɡlaɪsiːn/) is an organic compound with the formula C_{2}H_{5}NO_{2}, and is the simplest stable amino acid, distinguished by having a single hydrogen atom as its side chain. As one of the 20 proteinogenic amino acids, glycine is a fundamental building block of proteins in all life and is encoded by all codons starting with GG (GGU, GGC, GGA, and GGG). Because of its minimal side chain, it is the only common amino acid that is not chiral, meaning it is superimposable on its mirror image.

In the body, glycine plays several crucial roles. Its small and flexible structure is vital for the formation of certain protein structures, most notably in collagen, where glycine makes up about 35% of the amino acid content and enables the tight coiling of the collagen triple helix. Glycine disrupts the formation of alpha-helices in secondary protein structure, in favor instead of random coils. Beyond its structural role, glycine functions as an inhibitory neurotransmitter in the central nervous system, particularly in the spinal cord and brainstem, where it helps regulate motor and sensory signals. Disruption of glycine signaling can lead to severe neurological disorders and motor dysfunction; for example, the tetanus toxin causes spastic paralysis by blocking glycine release. It also serves as a key precursor for the synthesis of other important biomolecules, including the porphyrins that form heme in blood and the purines used to build DNA and RNA.

Glycine is a white, sweet-tasting crystalline solid, leading to its name from Greek word glykys (Greek: γλυκύς) or "sweet". While not an essential amino acid, as it is synthesized by the body, it is also obtained from the diet and produced industrially by chemical synthesis for use as a food additive, a dietary supplement, and an intermediate in the manufacture of products such as the herbicide glyphosate. Glycine can fit into hydrophobic environments due to its minimal side chain.

== History and etymology ==
Glycine was discovered in 1820 by French chemist Henri Braconnot when he hydrolyzed gelatin by boiling it with sulfuric acid. He originally called it "sugar of gelatin", but French chemist Jean-Baptiste Boussingault showed in 1838 that it contained nitrogen. In 1847 American scientist Eben Norton Horsford, then a student of the German chemist Justus von Liebig, proposed the name "glycocoll"; however, the Swedish chemist Berzelius suggested the simpler current name a year later. The name comes from the Greek word γλυκύς "sweet tasting" (which is also related to the prefixes glyco- and gluco-, as in glycoprotein and glucose). In 1858, the French chemist Auguste Cahours determined that glycine was an amine of acetic acid.

== Production ==
Although glycine can be isolated from hydrolyzed proteins, this route is not used for industrial production, as it can be manufactured more conveniently by chemical synthesis. The two main processes are amination of chloroacetic acid with ammonia, giving glycine and hydrochloric acid, and the Strecker amino acid synthesis, which is the main synthetic method in the United States and Japan. About 15 thousand tonnes are produced annually in this way.

Glycine is also co-generated as an impurity in the synthesis of EDTA, arising from reactions of the ammonia co-product.

== Structure ==
In aqueous solutions, glycine exists predominantly as a zwitterion (H_{3}N^{+}CH_{2}COO^{-}), a polar molecule with both a positive and negative charge. The zwitterion form is stabilized by hydrogen bonding with solvent water molecules. Analysis of neutron diffraction data for glycine showed that it was in the zwitterionic form in the solid state and confirmed the presence of hydrogen bonds. Theoretical calculations have been used to show that zwitterions may also be present in the gas phase for some cases different from the simple carboxylic acid-to-amine transfer.

== Chemical reactions ==
Its acid–base properties are most important. In aqueous solution, glycine is amphoteric: below pH = 2.4, it converts to the ammonium cation called glycinium. Above about pH 9.6, it converts to glycinate.

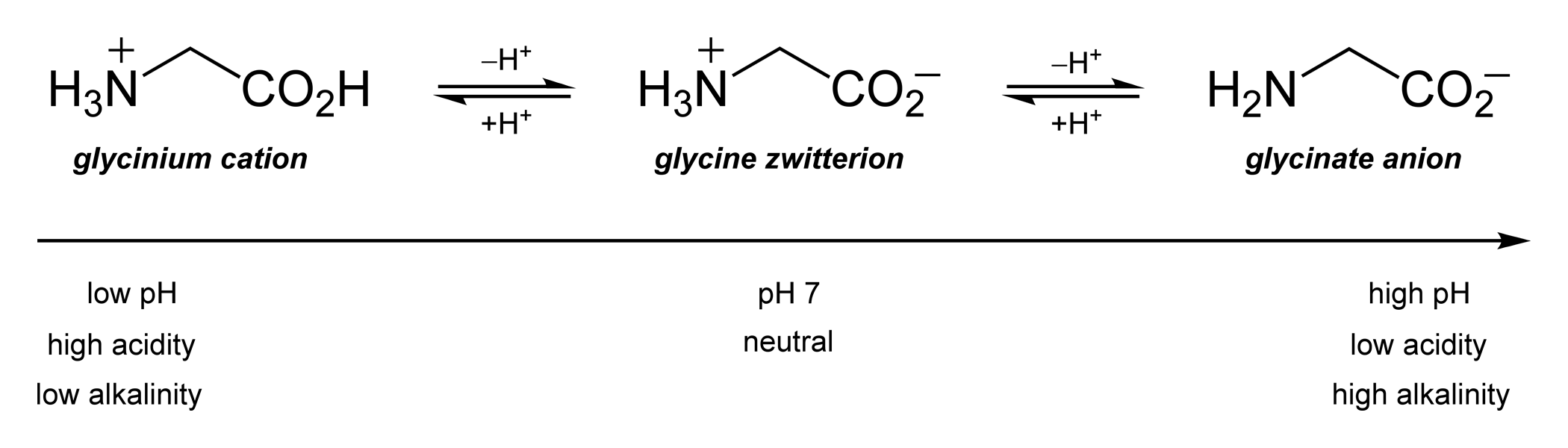

As a bifunctional molecule, glycine reacts with many reagents. These can be classified into N-centered and carboxylate-center reactions.

Glycine functions as a bidentate ligand for many metal ions, forming amino acid complexes. Representative complexes include iron glycinate, copper glycinate, and zinc glycinate.

With acid chlorides, glycine converts to the amidocarboxylic acid, such as hippuric acid and acetylglycine. With nitrous acid, one obtains glycolic acid (van Slyke determination). With methyl iodide, the amine becomes quaternized to give trimethylglycine, a natural product:

H_{3}N^{+}CH_{2}COO^{−} + 3 CH_{3}I → (CH_{3})_{3}N^{+}CH_{2}COO^{−} + 3 HI

Glycine condenses with itself to give peptides, beginning with the formation of glycylglycine:

2 H_{3}N^{+}CH_{2}COO^{−} → H_{3}N^{+}CH_{2}CONHCH_{2}COO^{−} + H_{2}O

Pyrolysis of glycine or glycylglycine gives 2,5-diketopiperazine, the cyclic diamide.

Glycine forms esters with alcohols. They are often isolated as their hydrochloride, such as glycine methyl ester hydrochloride. Otherwise, the free ester tends to convert to diketopiperazine.

== Metabolism ==
=== Biosynthesis ===
Glycine is not an essential amino acid, as it is biosynthesized in the body. However, it is considered semi-essential in that the amount that can be biosynthesized is insufficient for all metabolic uses.

It can be synthesized from the amino acid serine, which is in turn derived from 3-phosphoglycerate. In most organisms, the enzyme serine hydroxymethyltransferase catalyses this transformation via the cofactor pyridoxal phosphate:

serine + tetrahydrofolate → glycine + N^{5},N^{10}-methylene tetrahydrofolate + H_{2}O

In E. coli, antibiotics that target folate depletes the supply of active tetrahydrofolates, halting glycine biosynthesis as a consequence.

In the liver of vertebrates, glycine synthesis is catalyzed by glycine synthase (also called glycine cleavage enzyme). This conversion is readily reversible:

CO_{2} + NH^{+}_{4} + N^{5},N^{10}-methylene tetrahydrofolate + NADH + H^{+} ⇌ Glycine + tetrahydrofolate + NAD^{+}

In addition to being synthesized from serine, glycine can also be derived from threonine, choline or hydroxyproline via inter-organ metabolism of the liver and kidneys.

=== Degradation ===
Glycine is degraded via three pathways. The predominant pathway in animals and plants is the reverse of the glycine synthase pathway mentioned above. In this context, the enzyme system involved is usually called the glycine cleavage system:

Glycine + tetrahydrofolate + NAD^{+} ⇌ CO_{2} + NH^{+}_{4} + N^{5},N^{10}-methylene tetrahydrofolate + NADH + H^{+}

In the second pathway, glycine is degraded in two steps. The first step is the reverse of glycine biosynthesis from serine with serine hydroxymethyl transferase. Serine is then converted to pyruvate by serine dehydratase.

In the third pathway of its degradation, glycine is converted to glyoxylate by D-amino acid oxidase. Glyoxylate is then oxidized by hepatic lactate dehydrogenase to oxalate in an NAD^{+}-dependent reaction.

The half-life of glycine and its elimination from the body varies significantly based on dose. In one study, the half-life varied between 0.5 and 4.0 hours.

== Physiological function ==
The principal function of glycine is it acts as a precursor to proteins. Most proteins incorporate only small quantities of glycine, a notable exception being collagen, which contains about 35% glycine due to its periodically repeated role in the formation of collagen's helix structure in conjunction with hydroxyproline. In the genetic code, glycine is coded by all codons starting with GG, namely GGU, GGC, GGA and GGG.

=== As a biosynthetic intermediate ===
In higher eukaryotes, δ-aminolevulinic acid, the key precursor to porphyrins, is biosynthesized from glycine and succinyl-CoA by the enzyme ALA synthase. Glycine provides the central C_{2}N subunit of all purines.

=== As a neurotransmitter ===
Glycine is a neurotransmitter in the central nervous system with both inhibitory and excitatory roles. Specifically, it is an agonist at the inhibitory glycine receptor, and a co-agonist along with glutamate at the excitatory NMDA receptor.

The glycine receptor is expressed throughout the CNS, but especially in the spinal cord, brainstem, and retina. When glycine receptors are activated, chloride enters the neuron via the receptor, causing an inhibitory postsynaptic potential (IPSP). Strychnine is a strong antagonist at ionotropic glycine receptors, whereas bicuculline is a weak one. Removal of glycine from inhibitory glycinergic synapses is hypothesized to be primarily mediated by glycine transporter 2. This glycine transporter protein is predominantly expressed in neurons, and occurs in the hindbrain and spinal cord.

Glycine is a required co-agonist along with glutamate at the excitatory NMDA receptors. That is, these receptors only open their ion channels to let cations into the cell, when both glycine and glutamate are present, while the neuron is already somewhat depolarized. Removal of glycine from NMDA receptor-associated synapses is facilitated by glycine transporter 1, which is hypothesized to co-localize with NMDA receptors in the brain. This glycine transporter protein is predominantly expressed in glial cells, and occurs throughout the brain and spinal cord.

The LD_{50} of glycine is 7930 mg/kg in rats (oral), high concentrations are known to cause marked hyperexcitability and neurotoxicity via the activation of NMDA receptors.

Glycine-releasing neurons include subpopulations of amacrine cells in the retina and Renshaw cells in the spinal cord; both act as inihibitory interneurons.

=== As a toxin conjugation agent ===
Glycine conjugation pathway has not been fully investigated. Glycine is thought to be a hepatic detoxifier of a number of endogenous and xenobiotic organic acids. Bile acids are normally conjugated to glycine in order to increase their solubility in water.

The human body rapidly clears sodium benzoate by combining it with glycine to form hippuric acid which is then excreted. The metabolic pathway for this begins with the conversion of benzoate by butyrate-CoA ligase into an intermediate product, benzoyl-CoA, which is then metabolized by glycine N-acyltransferase into hippuric acid.

== Uses ==
In the US, glycine is typically sold in two grades: United States Pharmacopeia ("USP"), and technical grade. USP grade sales account for approximately 80 to 85 percent of the U.S. market for glycine. If purity greater than the USP standard is needed, for example for intravenous injections, a more expensive pharmaceutical grade glycine can be used. Technical grade glycine, which may or may not meet USP grade standards, is sold at a lower price for use in industrial applications, e.g., as an agent in metal complexing and finishing.

=== Animal and human foods ===
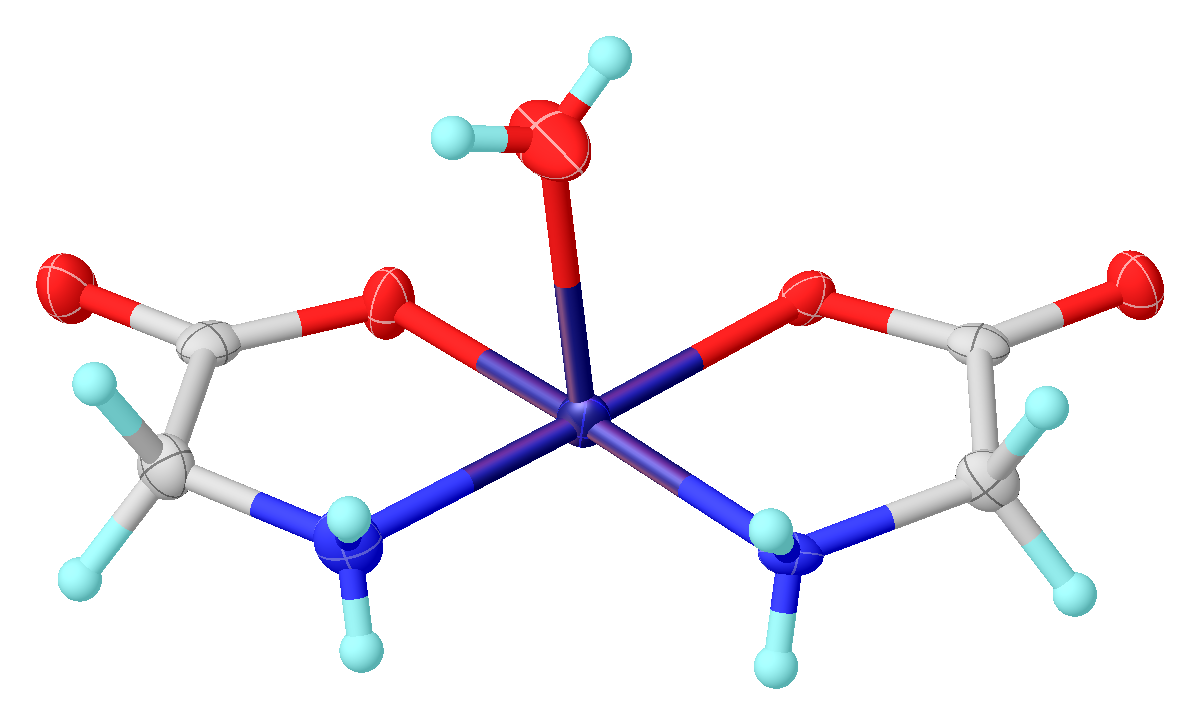
Structure of cis-Cu(glycinate)_{2}(H_{2}O)

Glycine is not widely used in foods for its nutritional value, except in infusions. Instead, glycine's role in food chemistry is as a flavorant. It is mildly sweet, and it counters the aftertaste of saccharine. It also has preservative properties, perhaps owing to its complexation to metal ions. Metal glycinate complexes, e.g. copper(II) glycinate are used as supplements for animal feeds.

As of 1971, the U.S. Food and Drug Administration "no longer regards glycine and its salts as generally recognized as safe for use in human food", and only permits food uses of glycine under certain conditions.

Glycine has been researched for its potential to extend life. The proposed mechanisms of this effect are its ability to clear methionine from the body, and activating autophagy.

=== Chemical feedstock ===
Glycine is an intermediate in the synthesis of a variety of chemical products. It is used in the manufacture of the herbicides glyphosate, iprodione, glyphosine, imiprothrin, and eglinazine. It is used as an intermediate of antibiotics such as thiamphenicol.

=== Laboratory research ===
Glycine is a significant component of some solutions used in the SDS-PAGE method of protein analysis. It serves as a buffering agent, maintaining pH and preventing sample damage during electrophoresis. Glycine is also used to remove protein-labeling antibodies from Western blot membranes to enable the probing of numerous proteins of interest from SDS-PAGE gel. This allows more data to be drawn from the same specimen, increasing the reliability of the data, reducing the amount of sample processing, and number of samples required. This process is known as stripping.

== Presence in space ==
The presence of glycine outside the Earth was confirmed in 2009, based on the analysis of samples that had been taken in 2004 by the NASA spacecraft Stardust from comet Wild 2 and subsequently returned to Earth. Glycine had previously been identified in the Murchison meteorite in 1970. The discovery of glycine in outer space bolstered the hypothesis of so-called soft-panspermia, which claims that the "building blocks" of life are widespread throughout the universe. In 2016, detection of glycine within Comet 67P/Churyumov–Gerasimenko by the Rosetta spacecraft was announced.

The detection of glycine outside the Solar System in the interstellar medium has been debated.

== Evolution ==
Glycine is proposed to be defined by early genetic codes. For example, low complexity regions (in proteins), that may resemble the proto-peptides of the early genetic code are highly enriched in glycine.

== Presence in foods ==
Food sources of glycine
Food	Percentage content by weight (g/100g)
Dry unsweetened gelatin powder	19
Snacks, pork skins	11.04
Sesame seeds flour (low fat)	3.43
Beverages, protein powder (soy-based)	2.37
Seeds, safflower seed meal, partially defatted	2.22
Meat, bison, beef and others (various parts)	1.5–2.0
Gelatin desserts	1.96
Seeds, pumpkin and squash seed kernels	1.82
Turkey, all classes, back, meat and skin	1.79
Chicken, broilers or fryers, meat and skin	1.74
Pork, ground, 96% lean / 4% fat, cooked, crumbles	1.71
Bacon and beef sticks	1.64
Peanuts	1.63
Crustaceans, spiny lobster	1.59
Spices, mustard seed, ground	1.59
Salami	1.55
Nuts, butternuts, dried	1.51
Fish, salmon, pink, canned, drained solids	1.42
Almonds	1.42
Fish, mackerel	0.93
Cereals ready-to-eat, granola, homemade	0.81
Leeks, (bulb and lower-leaf portion), freeze-dried	0.7
Cheese, parmesan (and others), grated	0.56
Soybeans, green, cooked, boiled, drained, without salt	0.51
Bread, protein (includes gluten)	0.47
Egg, whole, cooked, fried	0.47
Beans, white, mature seeds, cooked, boiled, with salt	0.38
Lentils, mature seeds, cooked, boiled, with salt	0.37

== See also ==
- Trimethylglycine
- Amino acid neurotransmitter
