= Zinc glycinate =

Names
- Other names zinc bis(glycinate) monohydrate

Identifiers
CAS Number	14281-83-5
3D model (JSmol)	Interactive image
ChemSpider	133891
DrugBank	DB14493
ECHA InfoCard	100.034.687
EC Number	238-173-1
PubChem CID	151910
UNII	681VJX72FE
CompTox Dashboard (EPA)	DTXSID60162193
- InChI: InChI=1S/2C2H5NO2.Zn/c2*3-1-2(4)5;/h2*1,3H2,(H,4,5);/q;;+2/p-2 Key: UOXSXMSTSYWNMH-UHFFFAOYSA-L
- SMILES: C(C(=O)[O-])N.C(C(=O)[O-])N.[Zn+2]

Properties
Chemical formula	C_{4}H_{8}N_{2}O_{4}Zn
Molar mass	213.50 g·mol^{−1}
Appearance	white solid
Density	1.99 g/cm^{3}

Hazards
- GHS labelling
Pictograms	(GHS05: Corrosive) (GHS07: Exclamation mark) (GHS09: Environmental hazard)
Signal word	Warning
Hazard statements	H302, H315, H318, H400
Precautionary statements	P264, P264+P265, P270, P273, P280, P301+P317, P302+P352, P305+P354+P338, P317, P321, P330, P332+P317, P362+P364, P391, P501
- Except where otherwise noted, data are given for materials in their standard state (at 25 °C [77 °F], 100 kPa). Infobox references

Zinc glycinate refers to compounds of Zn^{2+} with various amounts of glycinate anion as a ligand. A well-characterized derivative has the formula Zn(H_{2}NCH_{2}CO_{2})_{2}·H_{2}O. It arises by treating zinc oxide with glycine. According to X-ray crystallography, the solid is a coordination polymer with one water of crystallization per formula unit.

Other zinc-glycinates exist in aqueous solution including 1:1 and 1:3 species. The latter is the octahedral anion Zn(H_{2}NCH_{2}CO_{2})^{−}_{3}.

Structure of zinc bis(glycinate) polymer, which occurs in solid Zn(H_{2}NCH_{2}CO_{2})_{2}·H_{2}O.

The compound, which is classified as one of the transition metal amino acid complexes, is marketed as a nutritional supplement.
