= Pentazolate =

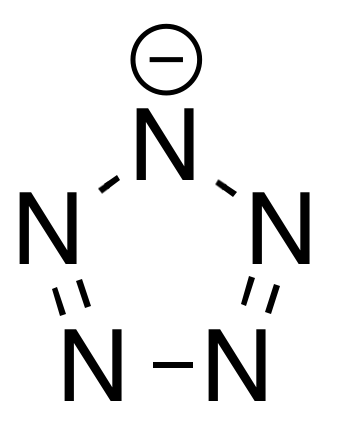

Identifiers
CAS Number	86840-63-3
3D model (JSmol)	Interactive image
PubChem CID	59450521
- InChI: InChI=1S/N5/c1-2-4-5-3-1/q-1 Key: DAHQTMWHOQRXRN-UHFFFAOYSA-N
- SMILES: N1=NN=N[N-]1

Properties
Chemical formula	N^{−}_{5}
Conjugate acid	Pentazole
- Except where otherwise noted, data are given for materials in their standard state (at 25 °C [77 °F], 100 kPa). Infobox references

Precursors to pentazolates. (R=3,5-dimethyl-4-hydroxylphenyl)

In chemistry, a pentazolate is a compound that contains a cyclo–N^{−}_{5} ion, the anion of pentazole. In 2017, researchers prepared the first salt (N_{5})_{6}(H_{3}O)_{3}(NH_{4})_{4}Cl containing pentazolate anion starting a substituted phenylpentazole, m-CPBA and iron(II) glycinate. A series of metal and nonmetal pentazolates were subsequently synthesized according to their work.

== List of pentazolates ==
	Appearance	Dec. temp (°C)	Ref
LiN_{5}	white	133	
LiN_{5}·3H_{2}O	colorless	139	
[Na(N_{5})(H_{2}O)]·2H_{2}O	colorless	111.3	
[Mg(N_{5})_{2}(H_{2}O)_{6}]·4H_{2}O	colorless	103.5	
[Al(N_{5})_{3}(H_{2}O)_{6}]·9H_{2}O	white	141.4	
[Mn(N_{5})_{2}(H_{2}O)_{4}]·4H_{2}O	colorless	104.1	
[Fe(N_{5})_{2}(H_{2}O)_{4}]·4H_{2}O	pale green	114.7	
[Fe(N_{5})_{3}(H_{2}O)_{6}]·9H_{2}O	reddish brown	108.9	
[Co(N_{5})_{2}(H_{2}O)_{4}]·4H_{2}O	bright orange	58.9	
AgN_{5}	pale white	120	
[Pb_{4}(OH)_{4}]_{4}(N_{5})_{4}	colorless	80	
[N(CH_{3})_{4}]N_{5}	white	80.8	
(NH_{3}OH)N_{5}	white	104.3	
[C(NH_{2})_{3}]N_{5}	white	88.1	
NH_{4}N_{5}	white	102.0	
N_{2}H_{5}N_{5}	white	85.3	
(CN_{7}H_{6})N_{5}		96.3	

== See also ==
- Azide (N_{3}^{−})
- Diazenide (N_{2}^{2−})
- Nitride (N^{3−})
