= Karl O. Christe =

German inorganic chemist (1936–2026)

Karl Otto Christe
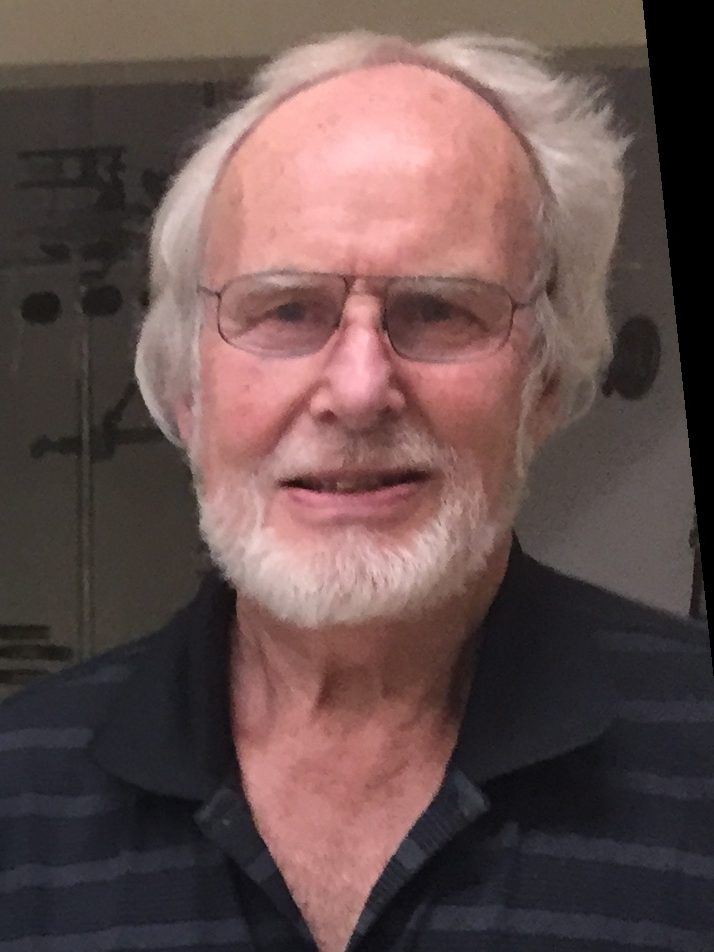
- Christe in 2017
- Born: July 24, 1936; Ulm, Gau Württemberg-Hohenzollern, Germany
- Died: April 19, 2026 (aged 89)
- Education: University of Stuttgart
- Known for: Fluorine Chemistry and homoleptic nitrogen compounds
- Awards: Tolman Award (2011)
- Scientific career
- Fields: Chemistry
- Workplaces: Loker Hydrocarbon Research Institute; University of Southern California
- Doctoral advisor: Josef Goubeau

Karl Otto Christe (July 24, 1936 – April 19, 2026) was a German-born American inorganic chemist. He was known for developing safe methods of studying highly reactive and dangerous chemicals, while his extensive experience in fluorine chemistry has earned him the title of 'The Fluorine God'. His research covered fluorine chemistry of nitrogen and halogens and the synthesis of new energetic materials.

== Background ==
In 1957 Christe began his chemistry studies at the University of Stuttgart. He prepared both his diploma (1960) and PhD theses (1961) under the supervision of Josef Goubeau. In 1962, Christe immigrated to the US and settled in California. He started working as a senior research chemist with Stauffer Chemical Co in Richmond, California. In 1967 he joined Rocketdyne Division Rockwell International in Canoga Park where he became the manager of research in 1978. In 1994 he accepted split positions between the Air Force Research Laboratory at Edwards Air Force Base and the Loker Hydrocarbon Research Institute of University of Southern California (USC). In 2005, he moved full-time to USC where he is working as a research professor.

Christe died on April 19, 2026, at the age of 89.

== Work ==
From the 1960s, Christe investigated the synthesis of new fluorides of nitrogen, halogen, and the halogen oxides, as well as their ions. Notable examples are the syntheses of both NF_{4}^{+} and ClF_{6}^{+}. On the occasion of the 100th anniversary of Henri Moissan's first production of fluorine, Christe in 1986 reported about the first truly chemical synthesis of fluorine. Another important field of his work covered the research on homoleptic nitrogen compounds for use in energetic materials. In this context, he synthesized the bent pentazenium cation, N_{5}^{+}, and was the first to experimentally detect the cyclic pentazolate anion, N_{5}^{−} and to prepare stable high nitrogen pentazolates. Both compounds are considered important milestones on the way to even heavier polynitrogen compounds. In 1996, Christe was the first to propose the use of ionic liquids as energetic materials in propulsion systems. Before retiring from USC he was working on the development of oxidizers to replace the dangerous ammonium perchlorate. Christe has authored over 400 peer-review publications, and held more than 60 patents.

In 2025, remarking on the discovery of the hexanitrogen molecule, the most energetic molecule yet made, Christe wrote: "This work is spectacular and, in my opinion, is worthy of a Nobel prize." He continued: "Compared to carbon chemistry, where two Nobel prizes were awarded for the discovery of two new carbon allotropes (buckyballs and graphene), the experimental observation of a neutral molecular nitrogen allotrope is orders of magnitude more difficult."

== Awards ==
- 1969: Apollo Achievement Award, NASA
- 1986: ACS National Award in Fluorine Chemistry, American Chemical Society (ACS)
- 1999: Star Team Award, US Air Force
- 2000: Henri Moissan Award, Institution du Prix Moissan, Paris
- 2003: ACS National Award in Inorganic Chemistry Award, ACS
- 2006: Alfred Stock Memorial Prize, Gesellschaft Deutscher Chemiker
- 2010: European Academy of Sciences and Arts, Salzburg
- 2011: Richard C. Tolman Award, ACS
- 2015: ACS National Award for Creative Research and Applications of Iodine Chemistry
- 2017: Fellow of the American Association for the Advancement of Science
- 2021: ACS National Award M. Frederick Hawthorne Award in Main Group Inorganic Chemistry

== Publications (selection) ==
- Guertin, Jacques P.; Christe, Karl O.; Pavlath, Attila E. (1966). "Complex Fluoro Cations. II. Tetrafluoronitrogen(V) Cation, NF_{4}^{+}. Synthesis and Properties of NH_{4}^{+}AsF_{6}^{−}". Inorganic Chemistry. 5 (11): 1921–1924. doi:10.1021/ic50045a018.
- Christe, Karl O. (July 1, 1973). "Hexafluorochlorine(VII) cation, CIF6+. Synthesis and vibrational spectrum". Inorganic Chemistry. 12 (7). American Chemical Society (ACS): 1580–1587. doi:10.1021/ic50125a021. ISSN 0020-1669.
- Christe, Karl O. (1986). "Chemical synthesis of elemental fluorine". Inorganic Chemistry. 25 (21): 3721–3722. doi:10.1021/ic00241a001.
- Christe, Karl O.; Wilson, William W.; Sheehy, Jeffrey A.; Boatz, Jerry A. (1999). "N_{5}^{+}: A Novel Homoleptic Polynitrogen Ion as a High Energy Density Material". Angewandte Chemie International Edition. 38 (13–14): 2004–2009. doi:10.1002/(SICI)1521-3773(19990712)38:13/14<2004::AID-ANIE2004>3.0.CO;2-7. PMID 34182671.
- Vij, Ashwani; Pavlovich, James G.; Wilson, William W.; Vij, Vandana; Christe, Karl O. (2002). "Experimental Detection of the Pentaazacyclopentadienide (Pentazolate) Anion, cyclo-N_{5}^{−}". Angewandte Chemie. 114 (16): 3177. doi:10.1002/1521-3757(20020816)114:16<3177::AID-ANGE3177>3.0.CO;2-I.
- Jones, C. Bigler; Haiges, Ralf; Schroer, Thorsten; Christe, Karl O. (2006). "Oxygen-Balanced Energetic Ionic Liquid". Angewandte Chemie International Edition. 45 (30): 4981–4984. doi:10.1002/anie.200600735. PMID 16819744.
- Christe, Karl O. (2007). "Recent Advances in the Chemistry of N_{5}^{+}, N_{5}^{−} and High-Oxygen Compounds". Propellants, Explosives, Pyrotechnics. 32 (3): 194–204. doi:10.1002/prep.200700020.
