= Copper(II) glycinate =

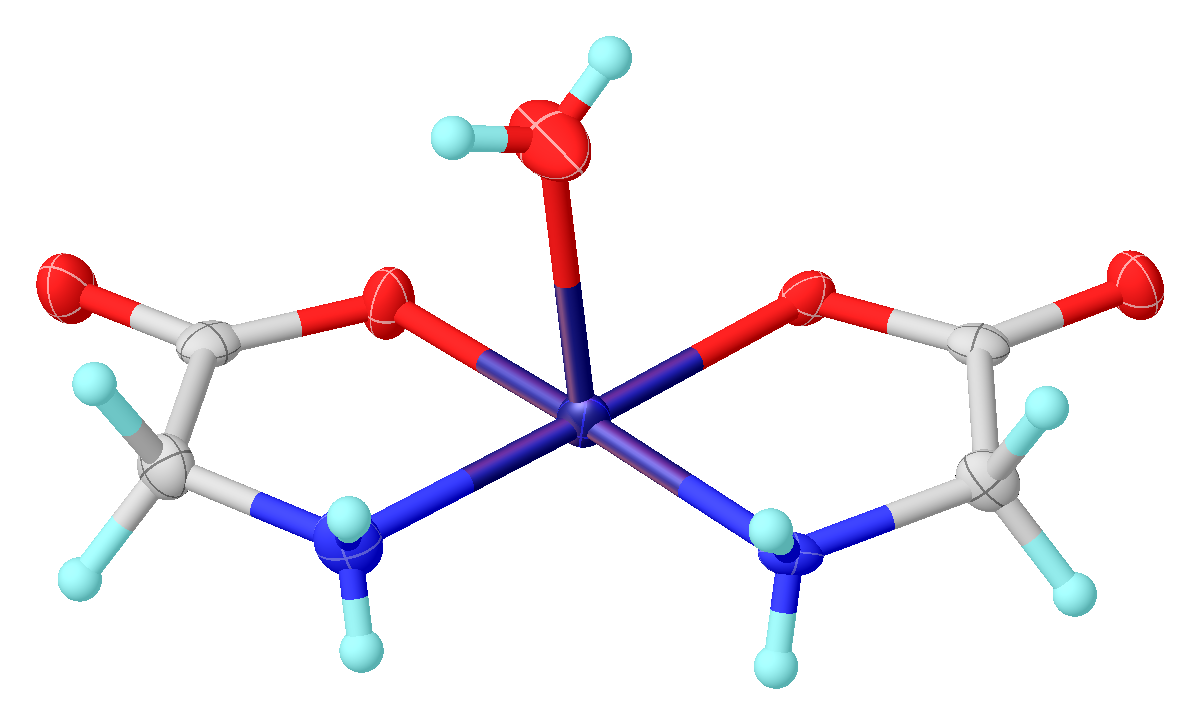
- Structure of the cis monohydrate form of bis(glycinato)copper(II)

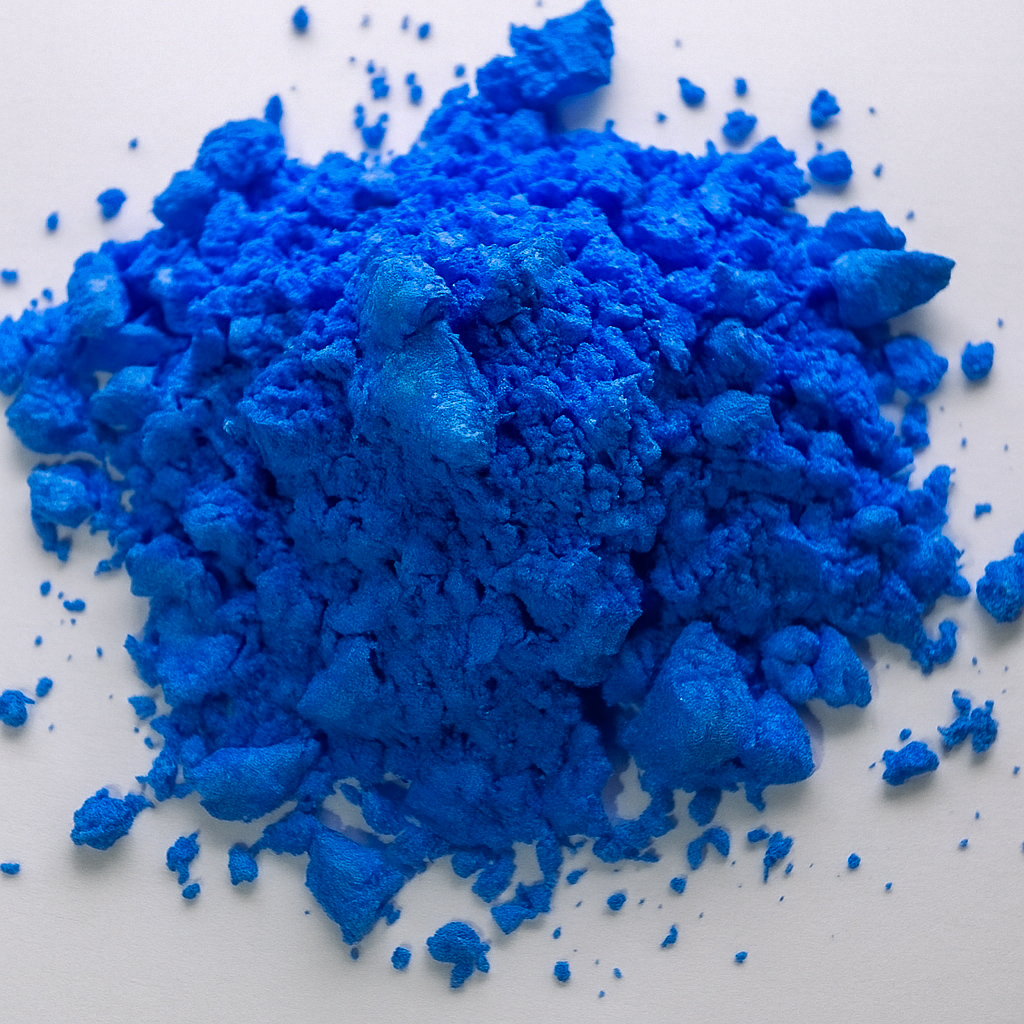
- Powdered bis(glycinato)copper(II) monohydrate (cis isomer)

Names
- IUPAC name bis(glycinato)copper(II)
- Other names cupric glycinate

Identifiers
CAS Number	13479-54-4 (anhydrous); 18253-80-0 (monohydrate)
3D model (JSmol)	Interactive image
ChemSpider	2297544
ECHA InfoCard	100.033.425
EC Number	236-783-2
PubChem CID	3032611
UNII	68VAV8QID7 (anhydrous); 163J4O4DFH (monohydrate)
CompTox Dashboard (EPA)	DTXSID40893690
- InChI: InChI=1S/2C2H5NO2.Cu/c23-1-2(4)5;/h21,3H2,(H,4,5);/q;;+2/p-2 Key: VVYPIVJZLVJPGU-UHFFFAOYSA-L
- SMILES: C(C(=O)[O-])N.C(C(=O)[O-])N.[Cu+2]

Properties
Chemical formula	C_{4}H_{10}CuN_{2}O_{5}
Molar mass	229.679 g·mol^{−1}
Appearance	light blue, flake-like crystals (cis form)
Density	2.029 g/cm^{3}
Melting point	212 °C (414 °F; 485 K) (decomp.)
Solubility in water	0.18 g/100 g (0 °C); 0.52 g/100 g (25 °C)
Solubility	soluble in DMF, DMSO, pyridine; slightly soluble in ethanol

Structure
Crystal structure	Orthorhombic
Space group	№ 19 (P2_{1}2_{1}2_{1})
Point group	222
Lattice constant	a = 5.21 Å, b = 10.81 Å, c = 13.49 Å
Formula units (Z)	4

Hazards
- GHS labelling
Pictograms	(GHS07: Exclamation mark) (GHS09: Environmental hazard)
Signal word	Warning
Hazard statements	H302, H315, H319, H400
Precautionary statements	P264, P270, P273, P280, P301+P312, P302+P352, P305+P351+P338, P321, P330, P332+P313, P337+P313, P362, P391, P501
- Except where otherwise noted, data are given for materials in their standard state (at 25 °C [77 °F], 100 kPa). Infobox references

Copper(II) glycinate (IUPAC suggested name: bis(glycinato)copper(II)) refers to the coordination complex of copper(II) with two equivalents of glycinate, with the formula [Cu(glycinate)_{2}(H_{2}O)_{x}] where x = 1 (monohydrate) or 0 (anhydrous form). The complex was first reported in 1841, and its chemistry has been revisited many times, particularly in relation to the isomerisation reaction between the cis and trans forms which was first reported in 1890.

All forms are blue solids, with varying degrees of water solubility. A practical application of the compound is as a source of dietary copper in animal feeds.

== Synthesis ==
Bis(glycinato)copper(II) is typically prepared from the reaction of copper(II) acetate in aqueous ethanol with glycine:

Cu(OAc)_{2} + 2 H_{2}NCH_{2}COOH + x H_{2}O → [Cu(H_{2}NCH_{2}COO)_{2}(H_{2}O)_{x}] + 2 AcOH, x = 0 or 1

The reaction proceeds through a non-redox dissociative substitution mechanism and usually affords the cis isomer.

== Structure ==
Like most amino acid complexes, the glycinate forms a 5-membered chelate ring, with the glycinato ligand serving as a bidentate (κ^{2}Ο,Ν) species. The chelating ligands assume a square planar configuration around the copper atom as is common for tetracoordinate d^{9} complexes, calculated to be much lower in energy than the alternative tetrahedral arrangement. A typical complex is Cu(glycinate)_{2}, i.e. Cu(H_{2}NCH_{2}CO_{2})_{2}, which exists both in cis and trans isomers.

=== Cis and trans isomerism ===
The unsymmetric nature of the ligand and square planar coordination thereof gives rise to two possible geometric isomers: a cis and a trans form.

Multiple ways of differentiating the geometric isomers exist, an easily accessible one being IR spectroscopy with the characteristic number of C–N, C–O, and Cu^{II}–N identifying the ligand configuration. Crystal appearance may also be of some value for isomer indication, though the ultimate diagnostic technique is X-ray crystallography.

All forms of the complex have been characterized crystallographically, the most commonly isolated one being the cis monohydrate (x = 1).

Isomerisation of the cis to the trans form occurs at high temperatures via a ring-twisting mechanism.
