= Glycine methyl ester hydrochloride =

Names
- IUPAC name Methyl glycinate hydrochloride
- Systematic IUPAC name Methyl 2-aminoacetate hydrochloride

Identifiers
CAS Number	5680-79-5
3D model (JSmol)	Interactive image
ChEMBL	ChEMBL544458
ChemSpider	109430
ECHA InfoCard	100.024.672
EC Number	227-139-1
PubChem CID	122755
UNII	R9RMX6E8BD
CompTox Dashboard (EPA)	DTXSID20205358
- InChI: InChI=1S/C3H7NO2.ClH/c1-6-3(5)2-4;/h2,4H2,1H3;1H Key: COQRGFWWJBEXRC-UHFFFAOYSA-N
- SMILES: COC(=O)CN.Cl

Properties
Chemical formula	C_{3}H_{8}ClNO_{2}
Molar mass	125.55 g·mol^{−1}
Appearance	white solid
Melting point	175–176 °C (347–349 °F; 448–449 K)

Hazards
- GHS labelling
Pictograms	(GHS07: Exclamation mark)
Signal word	Warning
Hazard statements	H315, H319, H335
Precautionary statements	P261, P264, P271, P280, P302+P352, P304+P340, P305+P351+P338, P312, P321, P332+P313, P337+P313, P362, P403+P233, P405, P501
- Except where otherwise noted, data are given for materials in their standard state (at 25 °C [77 °F], 100 kPa). Infobox references

Glycine methyl ester hydrochloride is the organic compound with the formula [CH_{3}O_{2}CCH_{2}NH_{3}]Cl. A white, water-soluble solid, it is the hydrochloride of the methyl ester of the amino acid glycine.

== Synthesis and reactions ==
Glycine methyl ester hydrochloride can be prepared by treatment of glycine with 2 equivalents of trimethylsilyl chloride, followed by the addition of methanol.

Upon treatment with base, the salt converts to glycine methyl ester.

Glycine methyl ester (and other esters of glycine) are not shelf-stable, tending to polymerize when stored at room temperature or convert to diketopiperazine. The hydrochloride is shelf-stable.
