= Pentazole =

Cyclic nitrogen compound with formula HN5

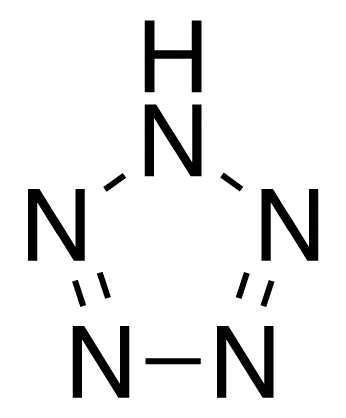
Kekulé, skeletal formula of pentazole
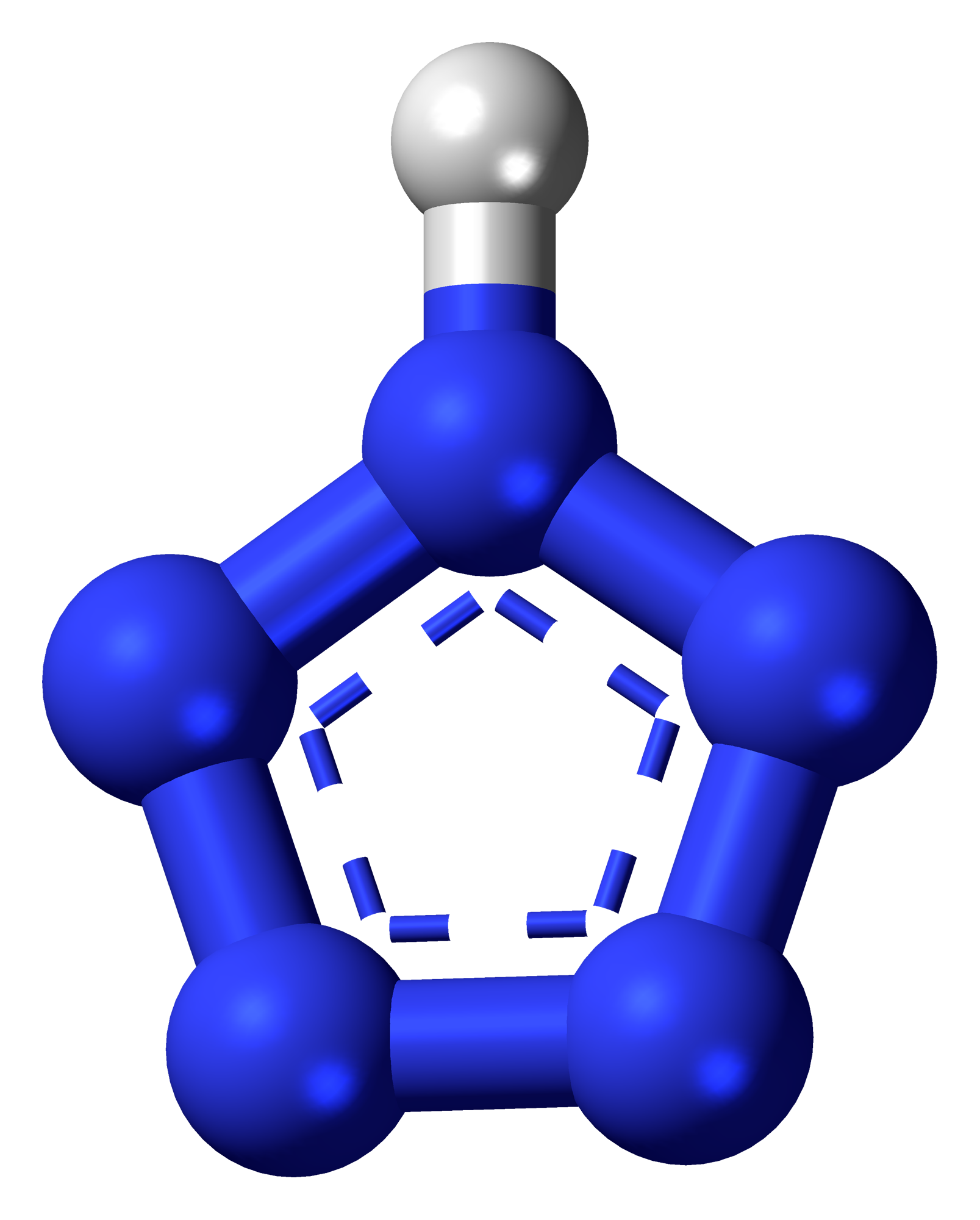
Ball-and-stick 3D structure

Names
- Systematic IUPAC name 1H-Pentazole

Identifiers
CAS Number	289-19-0
3D model (JSmol)	Interactive image; Interactive image
ChemSpider	4953932
PubChem CID	6451467
CompTox Dashboard (EPA)	DTXSID30183092
- InChI: InChI=1S/HN5/c1-2-4-5-3-1/h(H,1,2,3,4,5) Key: WUHLVXDDBHWHLQ-UHFFFAOYSA-N
- SMILES: n1nn[nH]n1; N1N=NN=N1

Properties
Chemical formula	N_{5}H
Molar mass	71.0414 g/mol
Conjugate acid	Pentazolium (not synthesized)
Conjugate base	Pentazolate
- Except where otherwise noted, data are given for materials in their standard state (at 25 °C [77 °F], 100 kPa). verify (what is ?) Infobox references

Pentazole is an aromatic molecule consisting of a five-membered ring with all nitrogen atoms, one of which is bonded to a hydrogen atom. It has the molecular formula HN_{5}. Although strictly speaking a homocyclic, inorganic compound, pentazole has historically been classed as the last in a series of heterocyclic azole compounds containing one to five nitrogen atoms. This set contains pyrrole, imidazole, pyrazole, triazoles, tetrazole, and pentazole.

== Derivatives ==
Substituted analogs of pentazole are collectively known as pentazoles. As a class, they are unstable and often highly explosive compounds. The first pentazole synthesized was phenylpentazole, where the pentazole ring is highly stabilized by conjugation with the phenyl ring. The derivative 4-dimethylaminophenylpentazole is among the most stable pentazole compounds known, although it still decomposes at temperatures over 50 °C. It is known that electron-donating groups stabilize aryl pentazole compounds.

== Ions ==
The cyclic pentazolium cation (N^{+}_{5}) is not known due to its probable antiaromatic character; whereas the open-chained pentazenium cation (N^{+}_{5}) is known. Butler et al. first demonstrated the presence of the cyclic N^{−}_{5} in solution through the decomposition of substituted aryl pentazoles at low temperature. The presence of N_{5}H and N^{−}_{5} (held in solution through the interaction with zinc ions) was proven primarily using ^{15}N NMR techniques of the decomposition products. These results were initially challenged by some authors, but subsequent experiments involving the detailed analysis of the decomposition products, complemented by computational studies, bore out the initial conclusion. The pentazolide anion is not expected to last longer than a few seconds in aqueous solution without the aid of complexing agents. The discovery of pentazoles spurred attempts to create all-nitrogen salts such as N^{+}_{5}N^{−}_{5}, which should be highly potent propellants for space travel.

In 2002, the pentazolate anion was first detected with electrospray ionization mass spectrometry In 2016, the ion was also detected in solution. In 2017, white cubic crystals of the pentazolate salt, (N_{5})_{6}(H_{3}O)_{3}(NH_{4})_{4}Cl were announced. In this salt, the N^{−}_{5} rings are planar. The bond lengths in the ring are 1.309 Å, 1.310 Å, 1.310 Å, 1.324 Å, and 1.324 Å. When heated, the salt is stable up to 117 °C, and over this temperature it decomposes to ammonium azide.

== High-pressure literature ==
Under extreme pressure conditions, the pentazolate ion was also synthesized. It was first obtained in 2016 in the form of the CsN_{5} salt by compressing and laser-heating a mixture of CsN_{3} embedded in molecular N_{2} at 60 GPa. Following the pressure release, it was found metastable down to 18 GPa. In 2018, another team reported the high pressure synthesis of LiN_{5} above 45 GPa from a pure lithium surrounded by molecular nitrogen. This compound could be retained down to ambient conditions after the complete release of pressure.
