= Iron(II) glycinate =

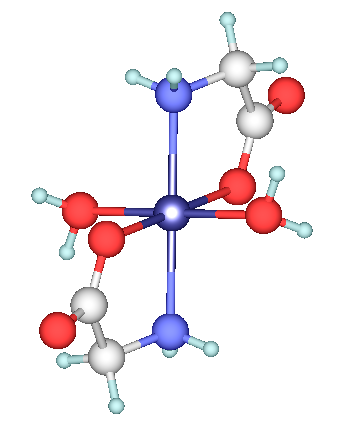
- Structure of the dihydrate

Names
- IUPAC name bis(2-aminoacetate);iron(2+)
- Other names: Ferrous glycinate; Iron(II) bisglycinate

Identifiers
CAS Number	20150-34-9
3D model (JSmol)	Interactive image
ChemSpider	8012845
DrugBank	DB11210
ECHA InfoCard	100.121.808
EC Number	606-444-7
PubChem CID	9837124
UNII	SFW1D987QV
CompTox Dashboard (EPA)	DTXSID30173978
- InChI: InChI=1S/2C2H5NO2.Fe/c2*3-1-2(4)5;/h2*1,3H2,(H,4,5);/q;;+2/p-2 Key: GIPOFCXYHMWROH-UHFFFAOYSA-L
- SMILES: C(C(=O)[O-])N.C(C(=O)[O-])N.[Fe+2]

Properties
Chemical formula	C_{4}H_{8}FeN_{2}O_{4}
Molar mass	203.963 g·mol^{−1}

Hazards
- GHS labelling
Pictograms	(GHS07: Exclamation mark) (GHS09: Environmental hazard)
Signal word	Warning
Hazard statements	H302, H312, H315, H319, H332, H400
Precautionary statements	P261, P264, P264+P265, P270, P271, P273, P280, P301+P317, P302+P352, P304+P340, P305+P351+P338, P317, P321, P330, P332+P317, P337+P317, P362+P364, P391, P501
- Lethal dose or concentration (LD, LC)
LD_{50} (median dose)	2800 mg kg^{−1} (oral, rat)
- Except where otherwise noted, data are given for materials in their standard state (at 25 °C [77 °F], 100 kPa). Infobox references

Iron(II) glycinate refers to an iron complex of glycinate. Such species are transition metal amino acid complexes. Some compositions are used as dietary supplements and in food fortification in the place of other sources of iron, often under the trademark Ferrochel. It is sometimes sold as a hydrochloride salt.

== Structure ==
The structure of one glycinate complex of iron(II) has been determined by X-ray crystallography. The octahedral complex features two bidentate glycinate ligands as well as two aquo ligands.

== Synthesis ==
Iron(II) glycinate is claimed to form when iron powder is treated with a two-fold molar excess of glycine in a citric acid solution. The citric acid acts as an antioxidant to prevent oxidation of Fe(II) to the more insoluble and therefore less bioavailable Fe(III) form:

Fe + 2 H_{2}NCH_{2}COOH → Fe(H_{2}NCH_{2}COO)_{2} + H_{2}

Commercial formulations retain the citric acid as a preservative, and include silicon dioxide (0.01%) and maltodextrin (2%).

== Safety ==
Since 2001, iron(II) glycinate has been generally regarded as safe by the Food and Drug Administration (FDA), with a No Observable Adverse Effect Level (NOAEL) of at least 500 mg kg^{−1} rat body weight. Compared to other iron salts, such as iron sulfate, it is associated with fewer adverse gastrointestinal effects and a higher bioavailability. For these reasons, it is a promising supplement for those with iron-deficiency anemia, and has shown significant increases in plasma ferritin, a protein that stores iron.

The European Food Safety Authority (EFSA) has evaluated ferrous bisglycinate for use in foods and supplements.
