= Hydrochloride =

Any salt of an organic base and hydrochloric acid

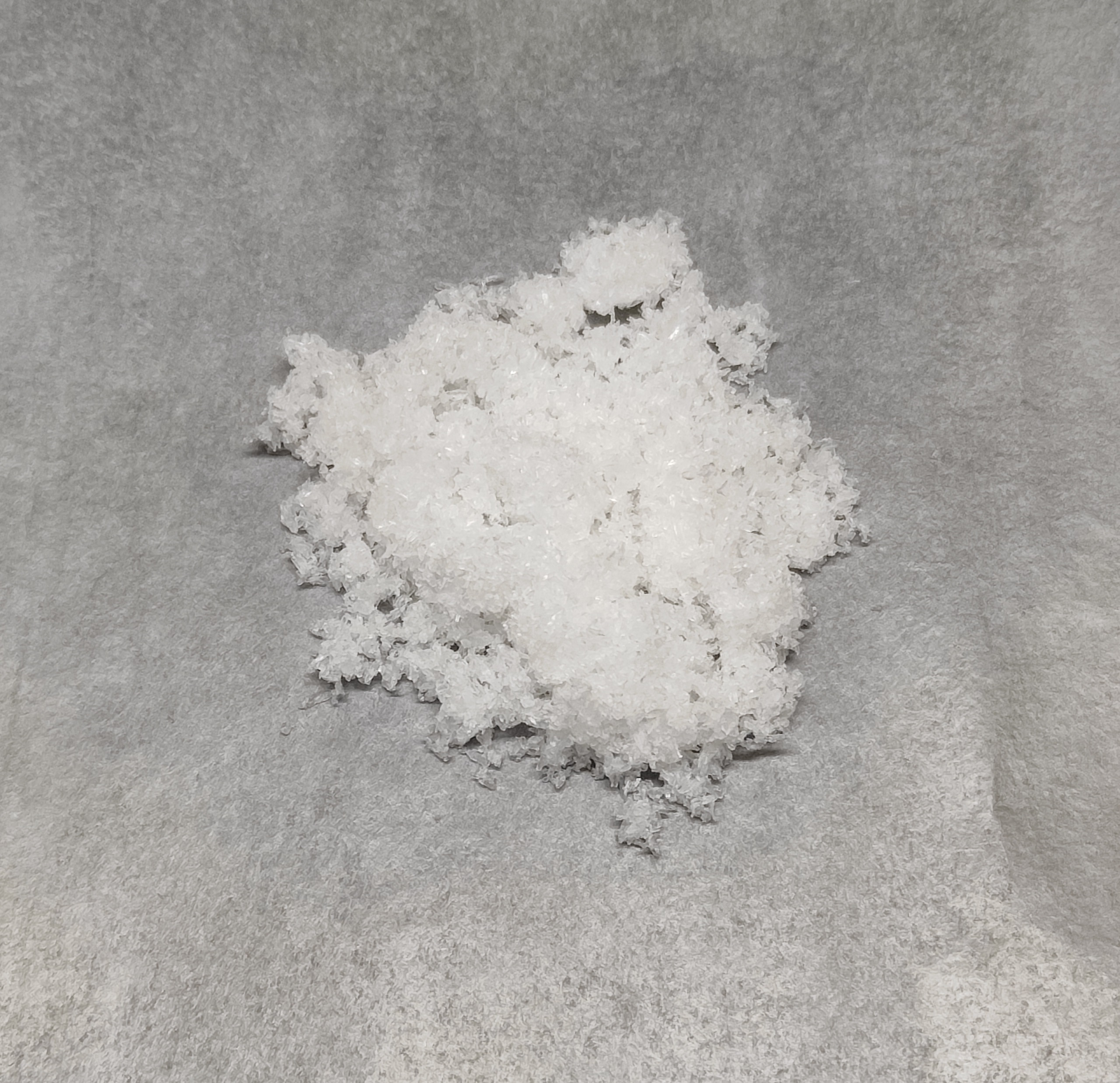
Sample of a hydrochloride salt, triethylammonium chloride

In chemistry, a hydrochloride is an acid salt resulting, or regarded as resulting, from the reaction of hydrochloric acid with an organic base (e.g. an amine). An alternative name is chlorhydrate, which comes from French. An archaic alternative name is muriate, derived from hydrochloric acid's ancient name: muriatic acid.

== Uses ==
Converting amines into their hydrochlorides is a common way to improve their water solubility, which can be desirable for substances used in medications. The European Pharmacopoeia lists more than 200 hydrochlorides as active ingredients in medications. These hydrochlorides, compared to free bases, may more readily dissolve in the gastrointestinal tract and be absorbed into the bloodstream more quickly. Additionally, many hydrochlorides of amines have a longer shelf-life than their respective free bases.

R - NH_{2} + HCl --> R - NH_{3}^{+} + Cl^{-}

Amine hydrochlorides represent latent forms of a more reactive free base. In this regard, formation of an amine hydrochloride confers protection. This effect is illustrated by the hydrochlorides of the amino acids. Glycine methyl ester hydrochloride is a shelf-stable salt that can be readily converted to a reactive glycine methyl ester, a compound that is not shelf-stable.

== See also ==
- Chloride, inorganic salts of hydrochloric acid
- Free base (chemistry)
- Quaternary ammonium cation
