= Ernst Christian Friedrich Schering =

German businessman

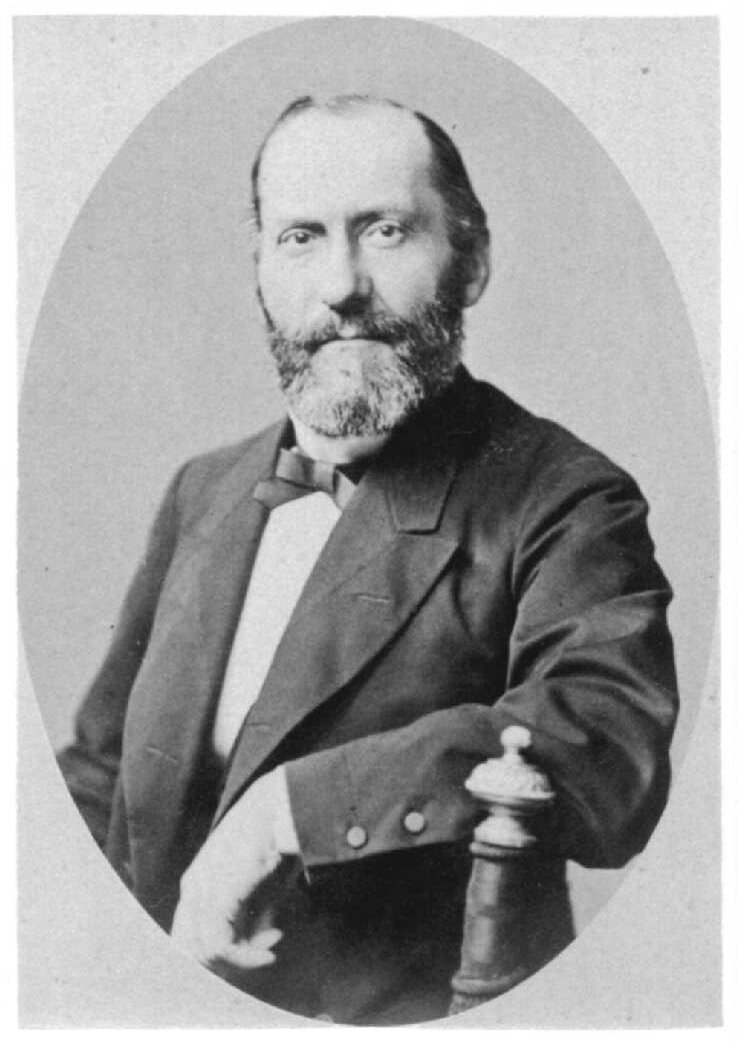
- Born: 31 May 1824; Prenzlau, Province of Brandenburg, Kingdom of Prussia, German Confederation
- Died: 27 December 1889 (aged 65); Berlin, Kingdom of Prussia, German Empire
- Known for: Founder of the Schering Corporation

Ernst Christian Friedrich Schering (31 May 1824 – 27 December 1889) was a German apothecary and industrialist who created the Schering Corporation. The company split into Schering AG and Schering-Plough after US assets were seized during World War II.

== Biography ==
Schering was born on 31 May 1824 in Prenzlau. In 1851 he opened a pharmacy in Chausseestrasse, in the north of Berlin. He died on December 27, 1889, and was buried in the Protestant Friedhof III der Jerusalems- und Neuen Kirchengemeinde (Cemetery No. III of the congregations of Jerusalem's Church and New Church) in Berlin-Kreuzberg, south of Hallesches Tor.

== Legacy ==
The Ernst Schering Prize, established in 1991, is awarded annually in his honour by the Schering Foundation for outstanding research in medicine, biology or chemistry.

Between 1986 and 2018, the Schering Foundation also awarded the Schering Prize, an award for the best chemistry dissertation at a Berlin university (originally restricted to the Technical University of Berlin). The first recipient was Thomas M. Klapötke.
