= Aminoguanidine =

Skeletal formula of a pimagedine
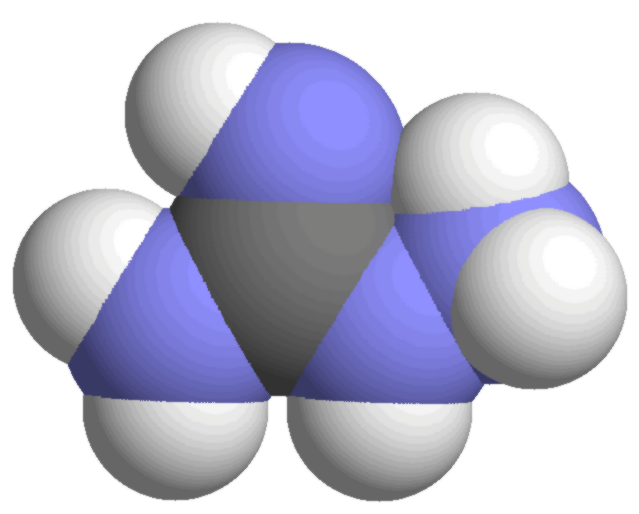
Spacefill model of a pimagedine

Names
- IUPAC name 2-Aminoguanidine
- Other names: Aminoguanidine; Guanyl hydrazine; Hydrazinecarboximidamide; Imino semicarbazide; Monoaminoguanidine; Pimagedine

Identifiers
CAS Number	79-17-4
3D model (JSmol)	Interactive image
ChEMBL	ChEMBL225304
ChemSpider	2061
ECHA InfoCard	100.001.076
IUPHAR/BPS	5135
KEGG	D05479
PubChem CID	2146
UNII	SCQ4EZQ113
CompTox Dashboard (EPA)	DTXSID5040964
- InChI: InChI=1S/CH6N4/c2-1(3)5-4/h1,4H,2-3H2 Key: DRCHNMARIZRTKI-UHFFFAOYSA-N
- SMILES: NC(N)N=N

Properties
Chemical formula	CH_{6}N_{4}
Molar mass	74.087 g·mol^{−1}
Appearance	Crystals
Density	1.72 g/cm^{3}
Melting point	206 °C (403 °F; 479 K) Decomposes
Solubility in water	Very soluble
Solubility in Ethanol	Very soluble

Related compounds
Related compounds	5-Aminotetrazole; Guanidine; Nitroguanidine
- Except where otherwise noted, data are given for materials in their standard state (at 25 °C [77 °F], 100 kPa). verify (what is ?) Infobox references

Aminoguanidine is the chemical compound with the formula NH_{2}C(=NH)NHNH_{2}. It is a versatile synthetic intermediate.

Aminoguanidine was studied as an investigational drug for the treatment of diabetic nephropathy, under the nonproprietary name Pimagedine, but never left the clinical trial phase due to side effects.

== Chemistry ==
=== Synthesis ===
The industrial synthesis uses the reaction between cyanamide and hydrazine in aqueous solution.

The compound can also be obtained from the reduction of nitroguanidine with zinc in acetic acid.

=== Properties ===
Aminoguanidine is a colorless solid that is soluble in water and ethanol. It is basic, producing salts when reacted with organic acids. As established by many crystallographic studies, protonation of aminoguanidine occurs at the imino nitrogen.

With formic acid, condensation occurs, leading to cyclization to give 3-amino-1,2,4-triazole.

The compound reacts with nitrous acid in acidic medium to give 5-aminotetrazole via the intermediate guanylazide.

At neutral pH, the reaction leads to tetrazene. Diazotization in acetic acid yields 1,3-di-(tetrazolyl)-triazene.

== Investigational drug ==
Pimagedine was investigated as a drug for kidney disease by the pharmaceutical company Alteon, but safety issues that appeared during clinical trials ended development before it was marketed and financial support was dropped for further trials.
