= Tetrazole =

1H-Tetrazole

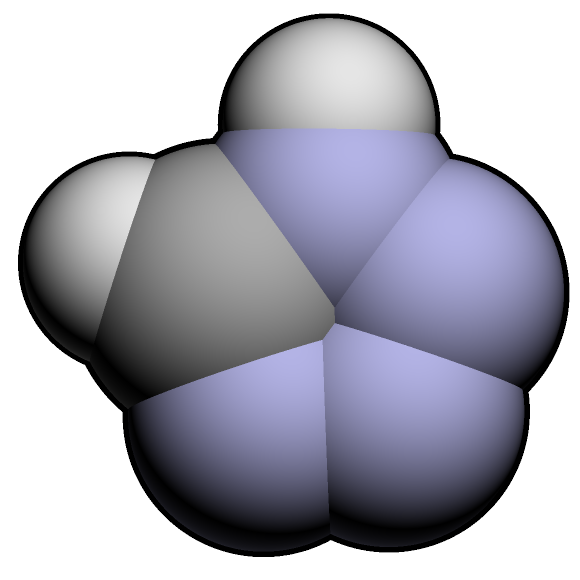

Identifiers
CAS Number	288-94-8
3D model (JSmol)	Interactive image
ChEBI	CHEBI:33193
ChemSpider	60842
ECHA InfoCard	100.005.477
PubChem CID	67519
UNII	D34J7PAT68
CompTox Dashboard (EPA)	DTXSID5075280
- InChI: InChI=1S/CH2N4/c1-2-4-5-3-1/h1H,(H,2,3,4,5) Key: KJUGUADJHNHALS-UHFFFAOYSA-N; InChI=1/CH2N4/c1-2-4-5-3-1/h1H,(H,2,3,4,5) Key: KJUGUADJHNHALS-UHFFFAOYAI; InChI=1S/CH2N4/c1-2-4-5-3-1/h1H,(H,2,3,4,5) Key: KJUGUADJHNHALS-UHFFFAOYSA-N
- SMILES: [nH]1nnnc1

Properties
Chemical formula	CH_{2}N_{4}
Molar mass	70.05 g/mol
Density	1.477 g/mL
Melting point	157 to 158 °C (315 to 316 °F; 430 to 431 K)
Boiling point	220 ± 23 °C (428 ± 41 °F; 493 ± 23 K)
Acidity (pK_{a})	4.90
- Except where otherwise noted, data are given for materials in their standard state (at 25 °C [77 °F], 100 kPa). verify (what is ?) Infobox references

A tetrazole is a synthetic organic heterocyclic compound, consisting of a 5-member ring of four nitrogen atoms and one carbon atom. The name tetrazole also refers to the parent compound - a whitish crystalline powder with the formula CH_{2}N_{4}, of which three isomers exist.

== Structure and bonding ==
Three isomers of the parent tetrazole exist, differing in the position of the double bonds: 1H-, 2H-, and 5H-tetrazole. The 1H- and 2H- isomers are tautomers, with the equilibrium lying on the side of 1H-tetrazole in the solid phase. In the gas phase, 2H-tetrazole dominates. These isomers can be regarded as aromatic, with 6 π-electrons, while the 5H-isomer is nonaromatic.

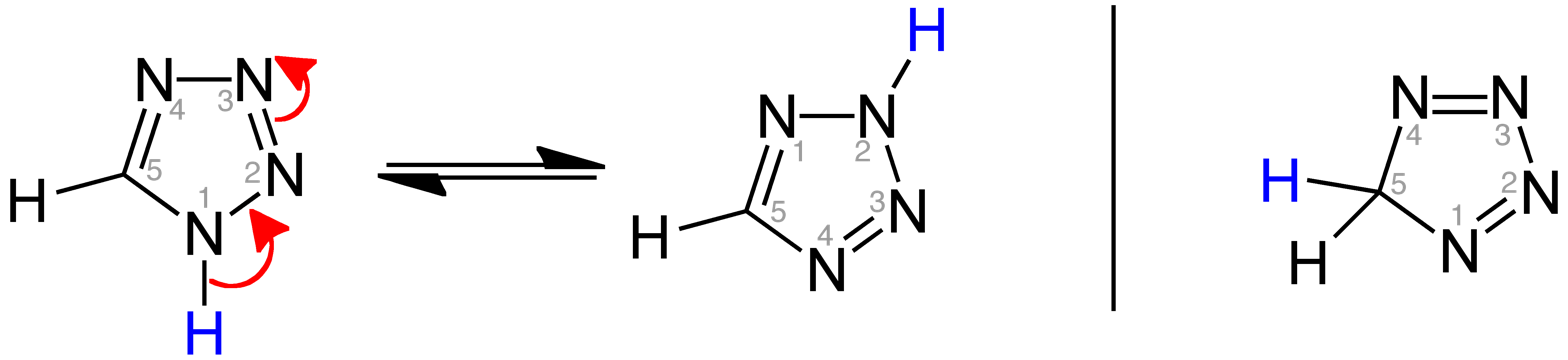
Tautomerization of the 1H-tetrazole (left) and 2H-tetrazole (middle) aromatic isomers in comparison with the nonaromatic 5H-tetrazole (right)

Phosphorus analogs do not have the same electronic nature, with 1H-tetraphosphole having a more pyramidal geometry of the phosphorus at position 1. Instead, it is the anionic tetraphospholides that are aromatic.

Strongly inductively electron-withdrawing functional groups attached to a tetrazole may stabilize a tautomeric ring-opening equilibrium with an azidoimine form.

== Synthesis ==
1H-Tetrazole was first prepared by the reaction of anhydrous hydrazoic acid and hydrogen cyanide under pressure. A Pinner reaction of organic nitriles with sodium azide in the presence of a buffered strong acid (e.g. triethylammonium chloride) synthesizes 5-substituted 1H-tetrazoles cleanly. Another method is the deamination of 5-aminotetrazole, which can be commercially obtained or prepared in turn from aminoguanidine.

2-Aryl-2H-tetrazoles are synthesized by a [3+2] cycloaddition reaction between an aryl diazonium and trimethylsilyldiazomethane.

== Uses ==
There are several pharmaceutical agents which are tetrazoles, including several cephalosporin-class antibiotics. Tetrazoles can act as bioisosteres for carboxylate groups because they have similar pKa and are deprotonated at physiological pH. Angiotensin II receptor blockers — such as losartan and candesartan, often are tetrazoles. A well-known tetrazole is dimethyl thiazolyl diphenyl tetrazolium bromide (MTT). This tetrazole is used in the MTT assay to quantify the respiratory activity of live cells culture, although it generally kills the cells in the process. Some tetrazoles can also be used in DNA assays. Studies suggest VT-1161 and VT-1129 are a potential potent antifungal drugs as they disturbs fungal enzymatic function but not human enzymes.

Some tetrazole derivatives have been investigated as high performance explosives (e.g azidotetrazole) and also for use in high performance solid rocket propellant formulations.

Other tetrazoles are used for their explosive or combustive properties, such as tetrazole itself and 5-aminotetrazole, which are sometimes used as a component of gas generators in automobile airbags. Tetrazole based energetic materials produce high-temperature, non-toxic reaction products such as water and nitrogen gas, and have a high burn rate and relative stability, all of which are desirable properties. The delocalization energy in tetrazole is 209 kJ/mol.

1H-Tetrazole and 5-(benzylthio)-1H-tetrazole (BTT) are widely used as acidic activators of the coupling reaction in oligonucleotide synthesis.

C,N substituted tetrazoles can undergo controlled thermal decomposition to form highly reactive nitrilimines. These can in turn undergo a variety of 1,3-dipolar cycloaddition reactions.

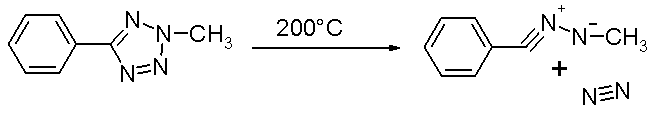
Scheme 2. Nitrilimine formation

== Related heterocycles ==
- Triazoles, analogs with three nitrogen atoms
- Pentazole, the analog with five nitrogen atoms (strictly speaking, an inorganic homocycle, not a heterocycle)
- Oxatetrazole
- Thiatetrazole
