= G2ZT =

Identifiers
CAS Number	1025740-53-7
3D model (JSmol)	Interactive image
- InChI: InChI=1S/C2N10.2C2H6N6/c3(1-5-9-10-6-1)4-2-7-11-12-8-2;2*3-1-6-7-2(4)8(1)5/h;2*5H2,(H2,3,6)(H2,4,7)/q-2;;/p+2/b4-3+;; Key: KSXSDQCPRJPUOR-CZEFNJPISA-P
- SMILES: NN1C(N)=[NH+]N=C1N.NN1C(N)=[NH+]N=C1N.N1=NN=N[C-]1N=N[C-]2N=NN=N2

Properties
Chemical formula	C_{6}H_{14}N_{22}
Molar mass	394.324 g/mol
- Except where otherwise noted, data are given for materials in their standard state (at 25 °C [77 °F], 100 kPa). verify (what is ?) Infobox references

G2ZT is a bistetrazole. It is an explosive approximately as powerful as RDX, but releases biodegradable reaction products when detonated: ammonia and hydrogen cyanide. When combined with ADN or AN oxidizers, the amount of HCN produced by a deflagration may be reduced. The compound is thus considered by its advocates to be an environmentally friendlier explosive than traditional nitroamine-based explosives.

G2ZT is otherwise known as bis(3,4,5-triamino-1,2,4-triazolium) 5,5'-azotetrazolate.
