= Glycine (data page) =

Chemical data page

The complete data for Glycine
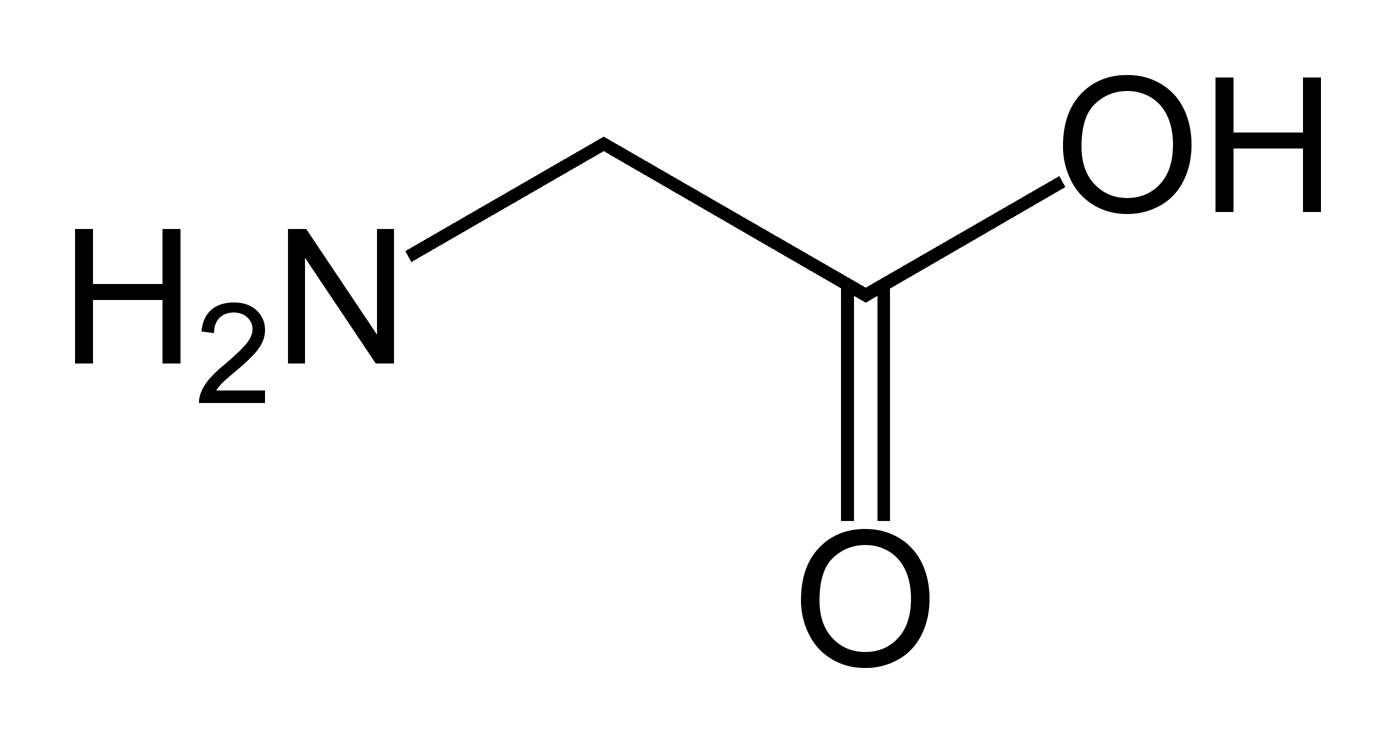
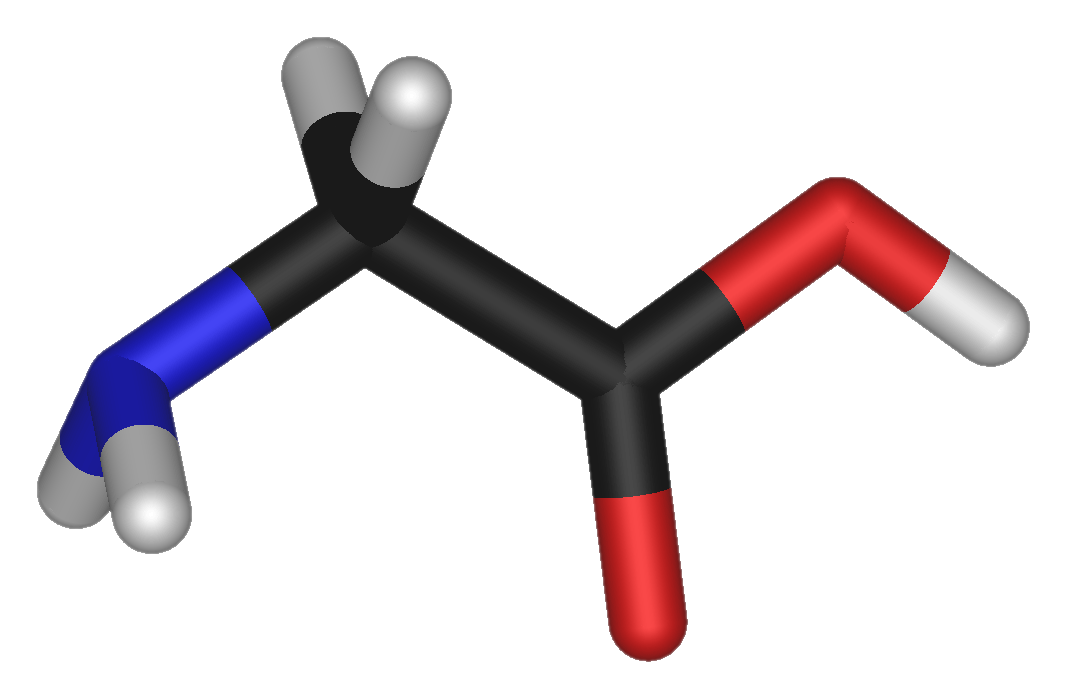
General information
Chemical formula: C_{2}H_{5}NO_{2}
Molar mass: 75.067 g·mol^{−1}
Systematic name:
2-aminoacetic acid
Abbreviations: G, Gly
Synonyms:
Aciport
Aminoacetic acid
Aminoethanoic acid
Amitone
Corilin
Glicoamin
Glycocoll
Glycolixir
Glycosthene
Glykokoll
Glyzin
Gyn-hydralin
Hampshire glycine
Hgly
Padil
Sucre de gelatine
Database data
SMILES: NCC(=O)O
InChI=1/C2H5NO2/c3-1-2(4)5/h1,3H2,(H,4,5)/f/h4H ^{a}

ATC: N/A	CAS: [56-40-6]	DrugBank: N/A	EINECS: 200-272-2 ^{a}	PubChem: 750 ^{b}

Physical properties

Structure	Crystal data	Spectral data: UV-Vis / IR / NMR / MS: Masses of main fragments: GMD MS Spectrum

Phase behavior	Solid properties ρ_{solid}: 1.607 g.cm^{−3} T_{m}: 290 °C	Liquid properties	Gas properties

Hazard properties

MSDS N/A	Main hazards: N/A	NFPA 704	Flash point: N/A	RTECS number: N/A

Chemical properties

XLogP: -3.415 ^{c}	pI: 5.97	pK_{a}: =2.34; 9.58	Tautomers:	Hydrogen bond: donor - 2 ^{d}; acceptor - 3 ^{e}

Pharmacological properties

This box:
- Except where noted otherwise, data relate to Standard temperature and pressure.
- Reliability of data general note.
