= Military aerodrome traffic zone =

UK Military aerodrome airspace type

A military aerodrome traffic zone (MATZ) is the airspace surrounding a military aerodrome in the United Kingdom.

== Purpose ==
Military aerodrome traffic zones have been established as detailed by the UK AIS and are listed in ENR 6-17. They provide protection to military aircraft traffic in the critical stages of circuit, landing and takeoff.

A MATZ airspace classification is the same as the airspace classification within which it lies, mostly class G (open airspace) in the UK. In the centre of the MATZ is an aerodrome traffic zone, ATZ.

The MATZ airspace has no legal recognised status under the UK Air Navigation Order (ANO) for civil pilots and no prior permission is required to enter it. For safety and good airmanship, pilots are strongly encouraged to obtain 2-way radio communications with the controlling air traffic service before transitting the airspace.

== Dimensions ==
- The MATZ is centred on the midpoint of the longest runway.
- The main airspace is a zone 5 nautical miles in radius from the surface to 3,000 feet above aerodrome level (aal).
- One or two stubs may project from the main airspace above, aligned with the selected runway. The stubs' dimensions are 5 nautical miles long, 4 nautical miles wide, 1000 feet to 3000 feet aal.

Exceptions to the above dimensions exist for certain military aerodromes.
