= 1-Diazidocarbamoyl-5-azidotetrazole =

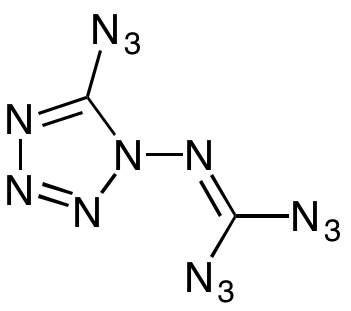

Names
- Preferred IUPAC name (5-Azido-1H-tetrazol-1-yl)carbonimidoyl diazide
- Other names: 1-Diazidocarbamoyl-5-azidotetrazole; 5-Azido-1-diazidocarbamoyltetrazole; N-(5-Azido-1H-tetrazol-1-yl)carbonimidic diazide

Identifiers
CAS Number	1306278-47-6
3D model (JSmol)	Interactive image
Abbreviations	AA
ChemSpider	30649737
PubChem CID	101796054
UNII	78AF7V9M78
CompTox Dashboard (EPA)	DTXSID901336271
- InChI: InChI=1S/C2N14/c3-11-6-1(7-12-4)10-16-2(8-13-5)9-14-15-16 Key: ROKXTJDNIZBVDB-UHFFFAOYSA-N
- SMILES: N(=[N+]=[N-])C1=NN=NN1N=C(N=[N+]=[N-])N=[N+]=[N-]

Properties
Chemical formula	C_{2}N_{14}
Molar mass	220.120 g·mol^{−1}
Density	1.723 g·cm^{−3}
Melting point	78 °C (172 °F; 351 K)
Boiling point	Violent explosion at 110 °C
Solubility in water	Insoluble
Solubility	Soluble in diethyl ether, acetone, hydrocarbons, chlorinated hydrocarbons

Structure
Crystal structure	orthorhombic
Space group	Pbcn
Lattice constant	a = 18.1289, b = 8.2128, c = 11.4021
Lattice volume (V)	1697.6
Formula units (Z)	8

Thermochemistry
Std enthalpy of formation (Δ_{f}H^{⦵}_{298})	357 kcal·mol^{−1} (1495 kJ·mol^{−1})

Explosive data
Shock sensitivity	<0.25 J
Friction sensitivity	<1 N
Detonation velocity	8960 m·s^{−1}

Hazards
- Occupational safety and health (OHS/OSH)
Main hazards	will unpredictably and violently detonate – part of the nitrogen highly energetic compounds family.
- Except where otherwise noted, data are given for materials in their standard state (at 25 °C [77 °F], 100 kPa). Infobox references

1-Diazidocarbamoyl-5-azidotetrazole (Note: Sometimes jokingly referred to as azidoazide azide) is a heterocyclic inorganic compound with the formula C_{2}N_{14}. It is a highly reactive and extremely sensitive explosive.

== Synthesis ==
1-Diazidocarbamoyl-5-azidotetrazole was produced by diazotizing triaminoguanidinium chloride with sodium nitrite in ultra-purified water. Another synthesis uses a metathesis reaction between isocyanogen tetrabromide in acetone and aqueous sodium azide. This first forms isocyanogen tetraazide, the "open" isomer of C_{2}N_{14}, which at room temperature quickly undergoes an irreversible cyclization reaction to form a tetrazole ring.

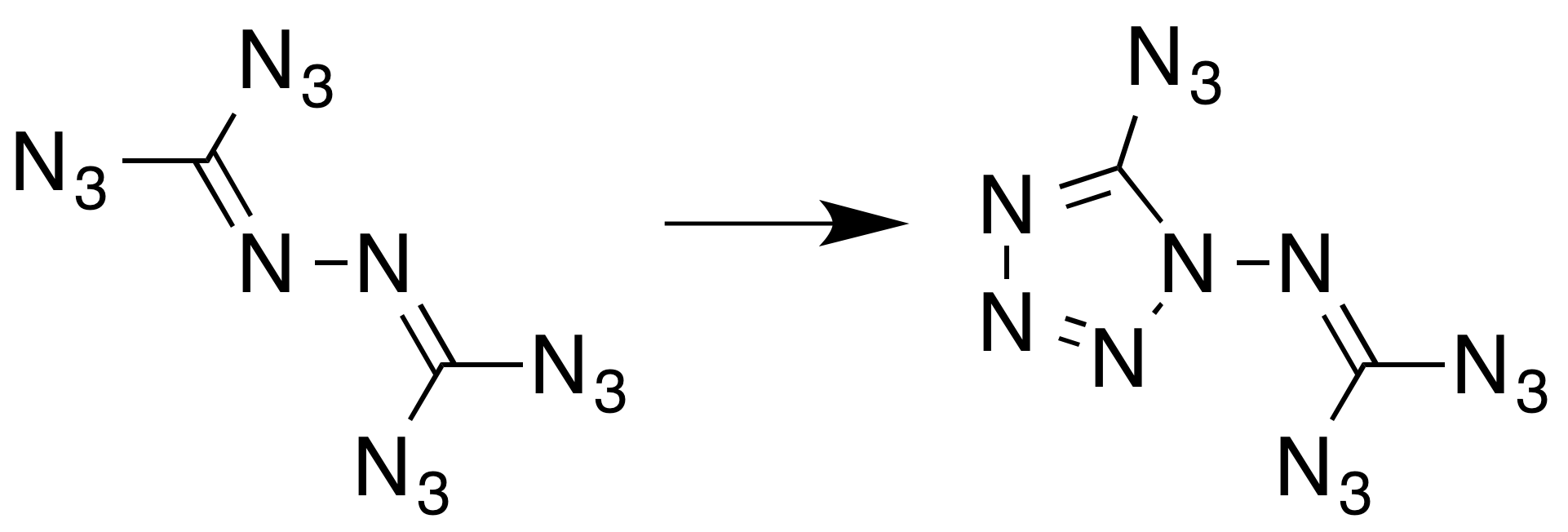

== Properties ==
The C_{2}N_{14} molecule is a monocyclic tetrazole with three azide groups. This ring form is in equilibrium with isocyanogen tetraazide, an isomeric acyclic structure that has long been known to cyclize quickly to the tetrazole.

It is one of a family of high energy nitrogen compounds in which the nitrogen atoms do not have strong triple bonds. This instability makes many such compounds liable to explosive decomposition, releasing nitrogen gas.

This tetrazole explosive has a decomposition temperature of 124 °C. It is very sensitive, with an impact sensitivity lower than 0.25 joules. It is, however, less sensitive than nitrogen triiodide and 1,1'-azobis(1,2,3,4-tetrazole). Decomposition can be initiated by only using contact or using a laser beam. For these reasons, it is often erroneously claimed to be the world's most sensitive compound.
