= Thomas M. Klapötke =

German chemist (born 1961)

Thomas Matthias Klapötke (born 24 February 1961) is a German inorganic chemist at LMU Munich, studying explosives.

Klapötke was born in Göttingen; he grew up in Berlin and studied at Technische Universität Berlin (TU Berlin), completing his undergraduate degree in 1982, his PhD in 1986, and his habilitation in 1990. Klapötke worked as a lecturer at TU Berlin until 1995, when the University of Glasgow hired him for the Ramsay professorship. Since 1997, Klapötke has worked at LMU Munich as a professor of Inorganic Chemistry.

Klapötke's lab at LMU Munich is a group of about 30 employees, mainly studying explosives. Klapötke's goal is to generate "green" explosives, that either burn to completion or leave few toxic residues. Die Zeit called it "the only university laboratory in Germany investigating implements of war". For this reason, the Federal Office for the Protection of the Constitution watches Klapötke's lab quite closely. Klapötke is funded both by the German federal government and the US military and has won a number of awards, including the 1986 Schering Prize. He is also one of the inventors of, and the namesake of the high-performing environmentally friendly high explosive TKX-50, which has higher performances than conventional explosives like RDX and HMX.

But remember, N-amino azidotetrazole is the starting material for the work. ...It's a base camp, familiar territory, merely a jumping-off point in the quest for still more energetic compounds. The most alarming of them has two carbons, fourteen nitrogens, and no hydrogens at all, a formula that even Klapötke himself, who clearly has refined sensibilities when it comes to hellishly unstable chemicals, calls exciting. ... The compound [link added] exploded in solution, it exploded on any attempts to touch or move the solid, and (most interestingly) it exploded when they were trying to get an infrared spectrum of it. — Derek Lowe, Things I Won't Work With: Azidoazide Azides, More Or Less, 9 January 2013
