= 5-Aminotetrazole =

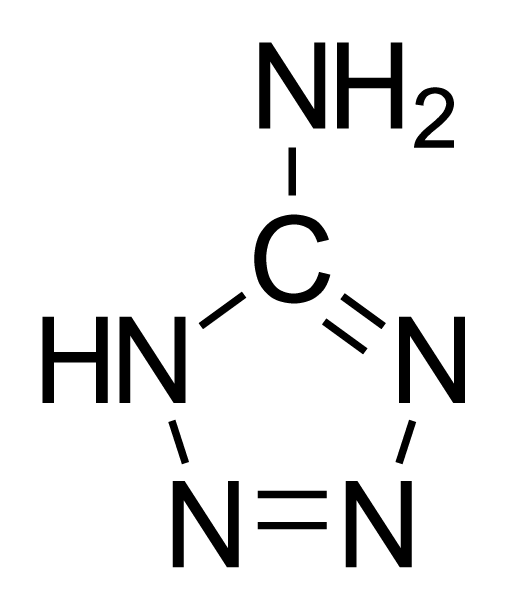

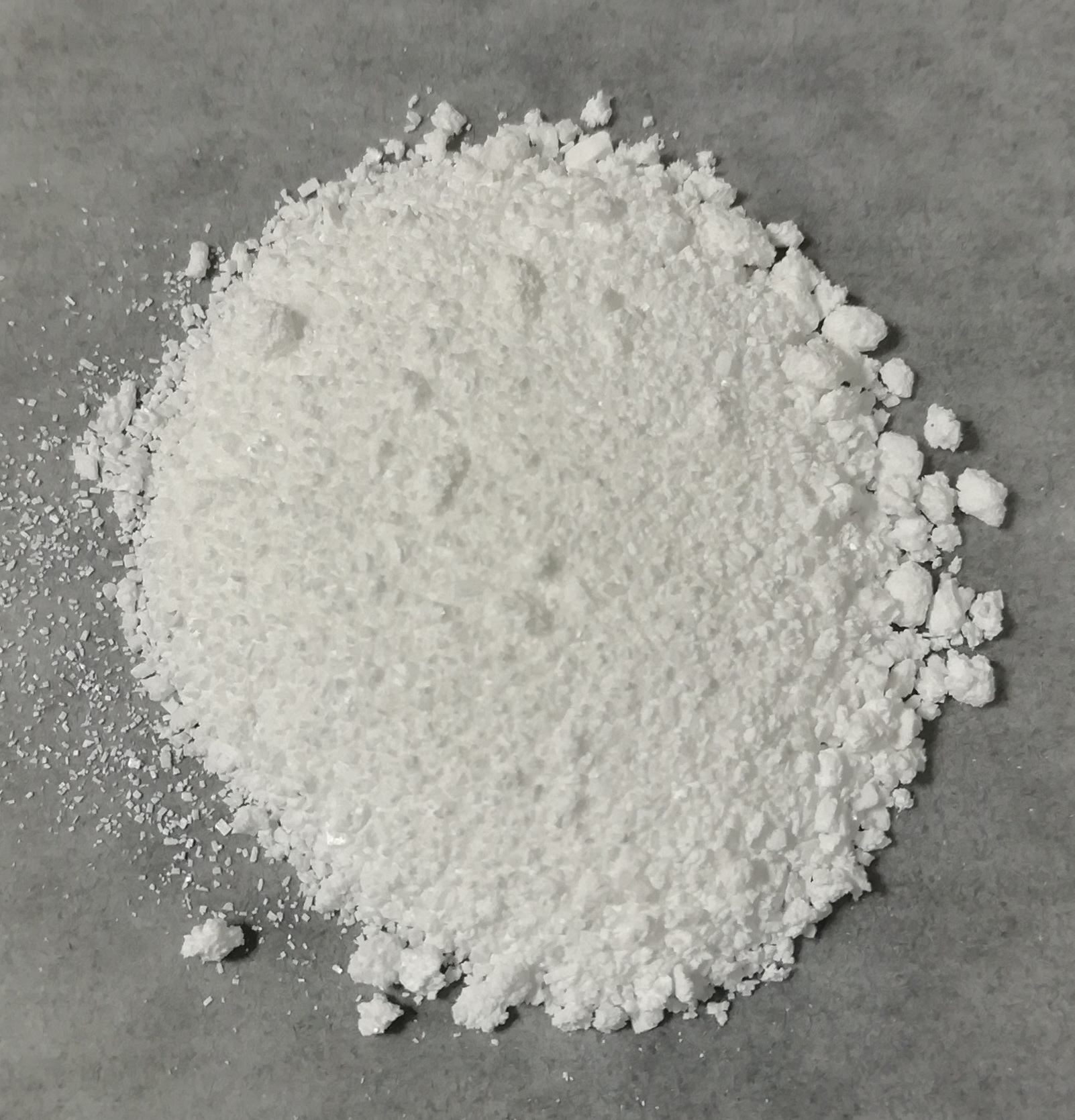

Names
- Preferred IUPAC name 1H-Tetrazol-5-amine
- Other names 5-ATZ

Identifiers
| CAS Number | 4418-61-5 |
| 3D model (JSmol) | Interactive image |
| ChemSpider | 19274 |
| ECHA InfoCard | 100.022.348 |
| PubChem CID | 20467 |
| UNII | 28JR5LD42T |
| CompTox Dashboard (EPA) | DTXSID7052103 |
- InChI: InChI=1S/CH3N5/c2-1-3-5-6-4-1/h(H3,2,3,4,5,6) Key: ULRPISSMEBPJLN-UHFFFAOYSA-N; InChI=1/CH3N5/c2-1-3-5-6-4-1/h(H3,2,3,4,5,6) Key: ULRPISSMEBPJLN-UHFFFAOYAD
- SMILES: c1([nH]nnn1)N

Properties
| Chemical formula | CH_{3}N_{5} |
| Molar mass | 85.070 g·mol^{−1} |
| Appearance | White solid |
| Density | 1.502 g/cm^{3} |
| Melting point | 201–205 °C (394–401 °F; 474–478 K) |

Hazards
- GHS labelling
| Pictograms | (GHS02: Flammable) (GHS05: Corrosive) |
- Except where otherwise noted, data are given for materials in their standard state (at 25 °C [77 °F], 100 kPa). Infobox references

5-Aminotetrazole is an organic compound with the formula HN_{4}CNH_{2}. It is a white solid that can be obtained both in anhydrous and hydrated forms.

The molecule is planar. The hydrogen bonding pattern in the hydrate supports the assignment of NH being adjacent to carbon in the ring.

== Preparation ==
A synthesis of 5-aminotetrazole through the action of nitrous acid on aminoguanidine was reported by Johannes Thiele in 1892.

The exact structure of the compound was not known at the time, although it was known to crystallize as a monohydrate. The correct structural formula was published in 1901 by Arthur Hantzsch, who obtained it from the reaction between cyanamide and hydrazoic acid.

To avoid direct handling of the problematic hydrazoic acid, a mixture of sodium azide and hydrochloric acid has been used to give the monohydrate at 73% yield.

In a more efficient and controllable one-pot synthesis, cyanamide is treated with hydrazine hydrochloride to give aminoguanidine hydrochloride, which is then diazotized as in Thiele's original process. Addition of ammonia or sodium hydroxide followed by heat-induced cyclization gives the anhydrous product in 74% yield.

== Structure ==
The structure of 5-aminotetrazole has been determined several times by X-ray crystallography, both as the anhydrous and monohydrated forms. The structures are very similar, consisting of a planar molecule, including the amino group.

== Uses ==
5-Aminotetrazole has found applications in heterocyclic chemistry, particularly as a synthon for some multicomponent reactions.

The N-4 is basic as indicated by its binding to metal halides, such as the coordination complex [CoCl_{2}(aminotetrazole)_{4}.

The compound has a particularly high nitrogen content of about 82%. Partly for this reason, the compound is prone to decomposition to nitrogen gas (N_{2}). It has been widely investigated for gas-generating systems, such as airbags and blowing agents.
