= Cobalt(II) carbonate =

- Co^{2+} CO_{3}^{2−}
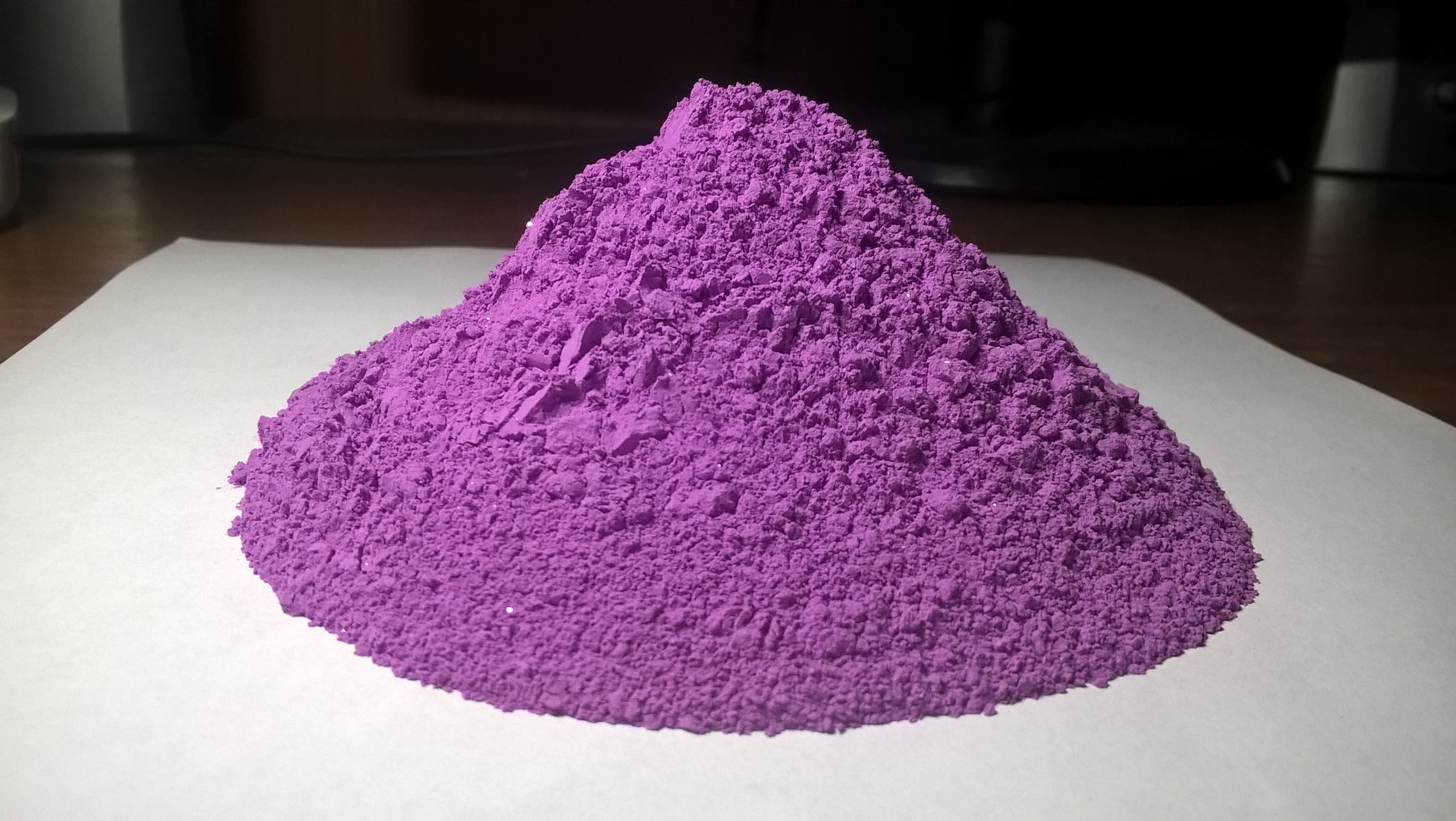
- Cobalt(II) carbonate powder

Names
- IUPAC name Cobalt(II) carbonate
- Other names Cobaltous carbonate; cobalt(II) salt

Identifiers
CAS Number	513-79-1; 12602-23-2 (cobalt carbonate hydroxide)
3D model (JSmol)	Interactive image
ChemSpider	10123
ECHA InfoCard	100.007.428
PubChem CID	10565
UNII	7H73A68FUV; W58TNI7T29 (cobalt carbonate hydroxide)
CompTox Dashboard (EPA)	DTXSID7052151
- InChI: InChI=1S/CH2O3.Co/c2-1(3)4;/h(H2,2,3,4);/q;+2/p-2 Key: ZOTKGJBKKKVBJZ-UHFFFAOYSA-L; InChI=1/CH2O3.Co/c2-1(3)4;/h(H2,2,3,4);/q;+2/p-2 Key: ZOTKGJBKKKVBJZ-NUQVWONBAB
- SMILES: C(=O)([O-])[O-].[Co+2]

Properties
Chemical formula	CoCO_{3}
Molar mass	118.941 g/mol
Appearance	pink solid
Density	4.13 g/cm^{3}
Melting point	427 °C (801 °F; 700 K) decomposes before melting to cobalt(II) oxide (anhydrous); 140 °C (284 °F; 413 K) decomposes (hexahydrate)
Solubility in water	0.000142 g/100 mL (20 °C)
Solubility product (K_{sp})	1.0·10^{−10}
Solubility	soluble in acid negligible in alcohol, methyl acetate insoluble in ethanol
Refractive index (n_{D})	1.855

Structure
Crystal structure	Rhombohedral (anhydrous); Trigonal (hexahydrate)

Thermochemistry
Std molar entropy (S^{⦵}_{298})	79.9 J/mol·K
Std enthalpy of formation (Δ_{f}H^{⦵}_{298})	−722.6 kJ/mol
Gibbs free energy (Δ_{f}G^{⦵})	−651 kJ/mol

Hazards
- GHS labelling
Pictograms	(GHS07: Exclamation mark) (GHS08: Health hazard)
Signal word	Warning
Hazard statements	H302, H315, H317, H319, H335, H351
Precautionary statements	P261, P280, P305+P351+P338
NFPA 704 (fire diamond)	2 0 0
- Lethal dose or concentration (LD, LC)
LD_{50} (median dose)	640 mg/kg (oral, rats)
- Except where otherwise noted, data are given for materials in their standard state (at 25 °C [77 °F], 100 kPa). verify (what is ?) Infobox references

Cobalt(II) carbonate is the inorganic compound with the formula CoCO_{3}. This pink paramagnetic solid is an intermediate in the hydrometallurgical purification of cobalt from its ores. It is an inorganic pigment, and a precursor to catalysts. Cobalt(II) carbonate also occurs as the rare red/pink mineral spherocobaltite.

== Preparation and structure ==
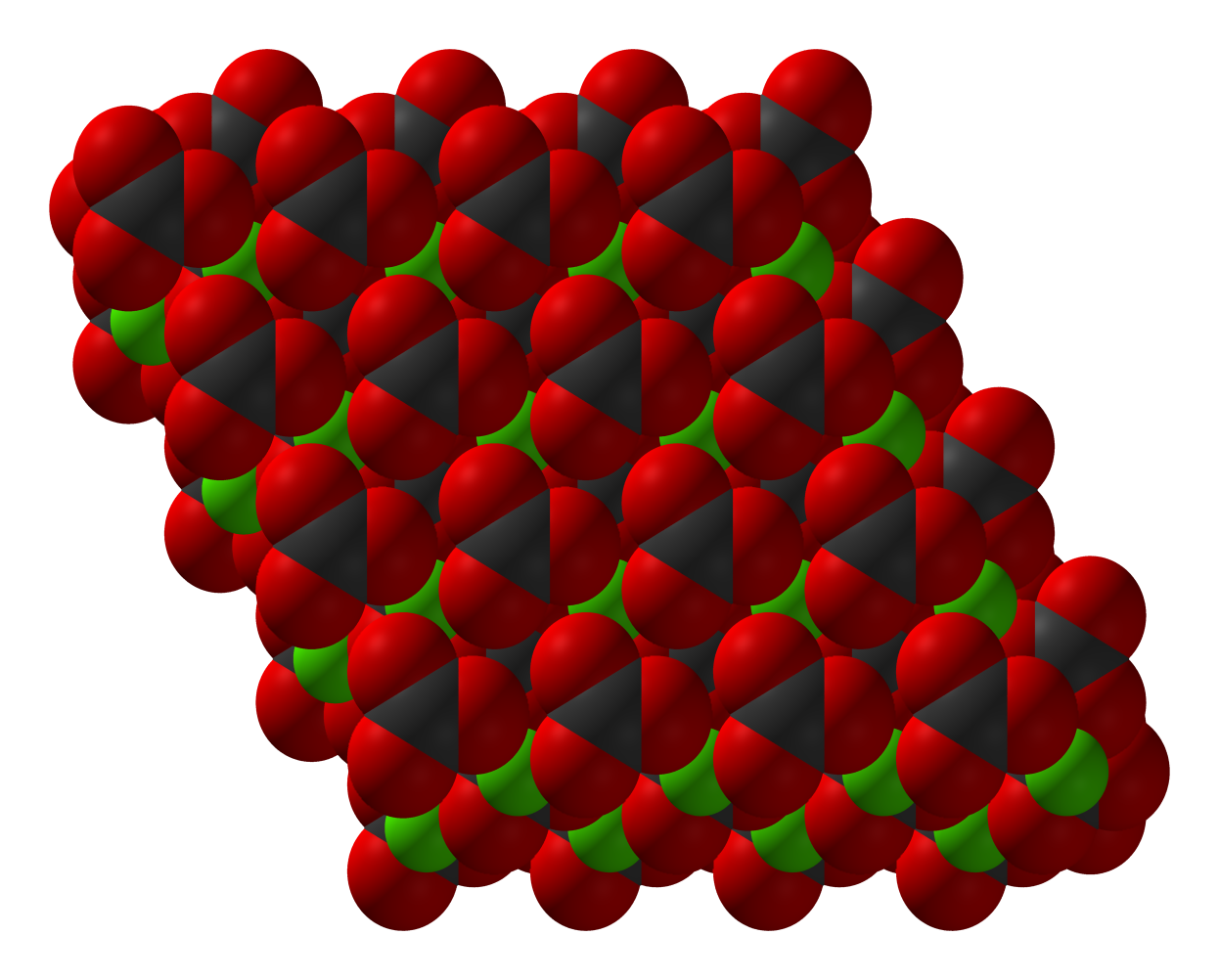
Structure of solid cobalt(II) carbonate shown with space-filling ions. Color code: red = O, green = Co, blck = C

It is prepared by combining solutions of cobalt(II) sulfate and sodium bicarbonate:

CoSO_{4} + 2 NaHCO_{3} → CoCO_{3} + Na_{2}SO_{4} + H_{2}O + CO_{2}

This reaction is used in the precipitation of cobalt from an extract of its roasted ores.

CoCO_{3} adopts a structure like calcite, consisting of cobalt in an octahedral coordination geometry.

== Reactions ==
Aqueous solutions of cobalt chloride can be prepared from cobalt(II) carbonate with hydrochloric acid according to this idealized equation:

CoCO_{3} + 2 HCl + 3 H_{2}O → CoCl_{2}·(H_{2}O)_{4} + CO_{2}

The reaction of cobalt(II) carbonate and acetylacetone in the presence of hydrogen peroxide gives tris(acetylacetonato)cobalt(III).

Heating the carbonate in air (calcining) is accompanied by partial oxidation:

6 CoCO_{3} + O_{2} → 2 Co_{3}O_{4} + 6 CO_{2}

The resulting Co_{3}O_{4} converts reversibly to CoO at high temperatures.

== Uses ==
Cobalt carbonate is a precursor to cobalt carbonyl and various cobalt salts. It is a component of dietary supplements since cobalt is an essential element. It is a precursor to blue pottery glazes, famously in the case of Delftware.

== Related compounds ==
At least two cobalt(II) carbonate-hydroxides are known: Co_{2}(CO_{3})(OH)_{2} and Co_{6}(CO_{3})_{2}(OH)_{8}·H_{2}O.

The moderately rare spherocobaltite is a natural form of cobalt carbonate, with good specimens coming especially from the Republic of Congo. "Cobaltocalcite" is a cobaltiferous calcite variety that is quite similar in habit to spherocobaltite.

Sodium tris(carbonato)cobalt(III) is a cobalt(III) complex containing three carbonate ligands.

== Safety ==
Toxicity has rarely been observed. Animals, including humans, require trace amounts of cobalt, a component of vitamin B12.
