= C4H16Cl3CoN4 =

The molecular formula C_{4}H_{16}Cl_{3}CoN_{4} (molar mass: 285.48 g/mol, exact mass: 283.9773 u) may refer to:

- Cis-Dichlorobis(ethylenediamine)cobalt(III)_chloride
- Trans-Dichlorobis(ethylenediamine)cobalt(III)_chloride
