= Sodium bis(carbonato)cuprate(II) =

Chemical compound

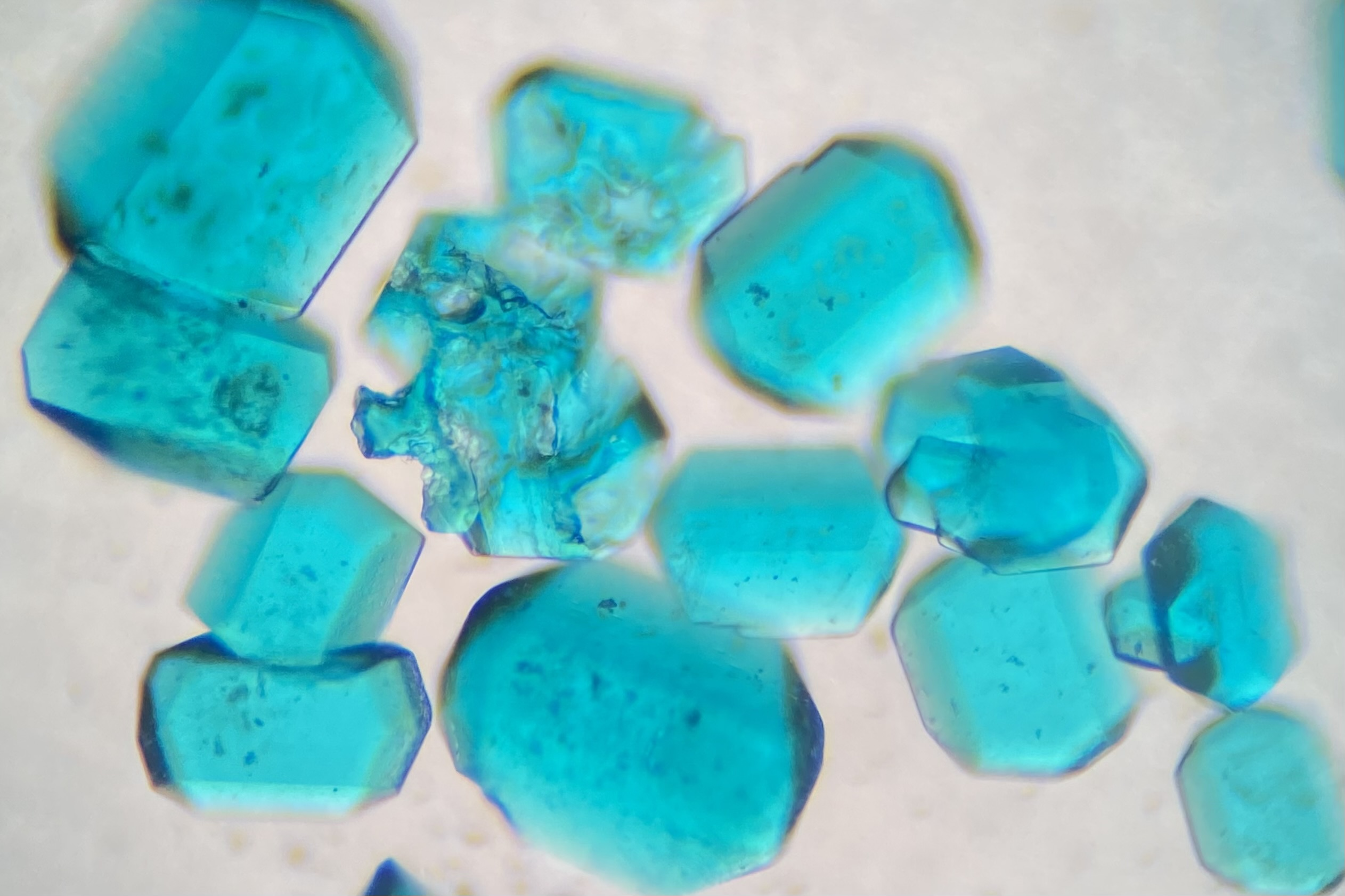

Names
- Other names: Sodium copper carbonate; Sodium dicarbonatocuprate(II)

Identifiers
3D model (JSmol)	Interactive image
PubChem CID	140332365
- InChI: InChI=1S/2CH2O3.Cu.2Na/c2*2-1(3)4;;;/h2*(H2,2,3,4);;;/q;;+2;2*+1/p-4 Key: APOKAJMQKXINAN-UHFFFAOYSA-J
- SMILES: C(=O)([O-])[O-].C(=O)([O-])[O-].[Na+].[Na+].[Cu+2]

Properties
Chemical formula	Na_{2}[Cu(CO_{3})_{2}]
Molar mass	229.542 g mol^{−1} (anhydrous) 283.587 g/mol^{−1} (trihydrate)
Appearance	royal blue solid (anhydrous)
Density	2.984 g/cm^{3} (anhydrous) 2.27 g/cm^{3} (trihydrate)
Melting point	decomposes

Structure
Crystal structure	monoclinic
Space group	p2_{1}/a
Lattice constant	a = 6.18 Å, b = 8.19 Å, c = 5.64 Å α = 90°, β = 116.2°, γ = 90°
Formula units (Z)	2 units per cell
- Except where otherwise noted, data are given for materials in their standard state (at 25 °C [77 °F], 100 kPa). Infobox references

Sodium bis(carbonato)cuprate(II) is a complex compound of copper containing the carbonato ligand, with the chemical formula Na_{2}[Cu(CO_{3})_{2}]. It forms royal blue, monoclinic crystals. A trihydrate exists.

== Occurrence ==
The anhydrous form occurs naturally as the mineral juangodoyite, while the trihydrate is found as chalconatronite.

It can also be found as a corrosion product in objects made of copper alloy and formed as an intermediate in the production of Cu/ZnO/Al_{2}O_{3} catalysts.

== Properties ==
The compound decomposes in water but can be recrystallized from a concentrated solution of sodium carbonate containing bicarbonate.

Like all other copper(II) compounds, sodium bis(carbonato)cuprate(II) is paramagnetic due to the unpaired electron in its 3d orbital.

== Preparation ==
The trihydrate can be prepared by treating a sodium carbonate-bicarbonate solution with aqueous copper(II) acetate dropwise at 50 °C under stirring. A clear, deep blue solution free of basic copper carbonate is obtained. Needle-like crystals of the product form upon cooling.

The anhydrous compound can be prepared by heating the trihydrate in boiling saturated aqueous sodium carbonate-bicarbonate solution. Elongated, royal blue insoluble single crystals are obtained.

== Related compounds ==
The potassium salt, potassium bis(carbonato)cuprate(II) (K_{2}Cu(CO_{3})_{2}), has been characterized by single-crystal X-ray diffraction.

Sodium salts of carbonato complexes of other metals including magnesium, cobalt, nickel, and zinc have also been investigated.
