= Nickel glycinate =

Chemical compound

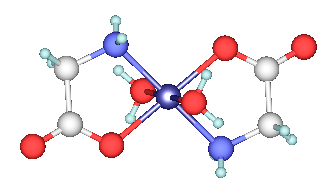
- Structure of the dihydrate

Identifiers
3D model (JSmol)	dihydrate: Interactive image
ChemSpider	anhydrous: 13298629
PubChem CID	anhydrous: 4213884; dihydrate: 129678475
- InChI: dihydrate: InChI=1S/2C2H5NO2.Ni.2H2O/c2*3-1-2(4)5;;;/h2*1,3H2,(H,4,5);;2*1H2 Key: DLHJJVBJHAEMTB-UHFFFAOYSA-N
- SMILES: dihydrate: C(C(=O)O)N.C(C(=O)O)N.O.O.[Ni]
- Except where otherwise noted, data are given for materials in their standard state (at 25 °C [77 °F], 100 kPa). Infobox references

Nickel glycinate can refer to several nickel(II) (that is Ni^{2+}) derivatives of glycinate (H_{2}NCH_{2}CO^{−}_{2}). These species are coordination complexes where glycinate functions as a bidentate ligand. More specifically, these species are transition metal amino acid complexes. Representative examples are [Ni(H_{2}NCH_{2}CO_{2})_{2}(H_{2}O)_{2}] and [Ni(H_{2}NCH_{2}CO_{2})_{3}]^{−}
