= Peptidyl-glycinamidase =

Identifiers
- EC no.: 3.4.19.2
- CAS no.: 94047-14-0

Databases
- IntEnz: IntEnz view
- BRENDA: BRENDA entry
- ExPASy: NiceZyme view
- KEGG: KEGG entry
- MetaCyc: metabolic pathway
- PRIAM: profile
- PDB structures: RCSB PDB PDBe PDBsum
Search
- PMC: articles
- PubMed: articles
- NCBI: proteins

Peptidyl-glycinamidase (EC 3.4.19.2, carboxyamidase, peptidyl carboxy-amidase, peptidyl-aminoacylamidase, carboxamidopeptidase, peptidyl amino acid amide hydrolase) is an enzyme. This enzyme catalyses the following chemical reaction

Cleavage of C-terminal glycinamide from polypeptides

This enzyme inactivates vasopressin and oxytocin by splitting off glycinamide.
