= Tris(glycinato)cobalt(III) =

Names
- Other names cobalt(III) glycinate

Identifiers
CAS Number	14221-43-3 all isomers; 21520-57-0 fac isomers; 30364-77-3 mer isomers
3D model (JSmol)	Interactive image
ChemSpider	377239
PubChem CID	3801094
- InChI: InChI=1S/3C2H5NO2.Co/c3*3-1-2(4)5;/h3*1,3H2,(H,4,5); Key: WZUSLISJDHJYHZ-UHFFFAOYSA-N
- SMILES: C(C(=O)O)N.C(C(=O)O)N.C(C(=O)O)N.[Co]

Properties
Appearance	violet or reddish solids
Solubility in water	0.199 g/L (red isomer, 25 °C), 9.33 g/L (violet, 25 °C)
- Except where otherwise noted, data are given for materials in their standard state (at 25 °C [77 °F], 100 kPa). Infobox references

Tris(glycinato)cobalt(III) describes coordination complexes with the formula Co(H_{2}NCH_{2}CO_{2})_{3}. Several isomers exist of these octahedral complexes formed between low-spin d^{6} Co(III) and the conjugate base of the amino acid glycine.

== Structures ==
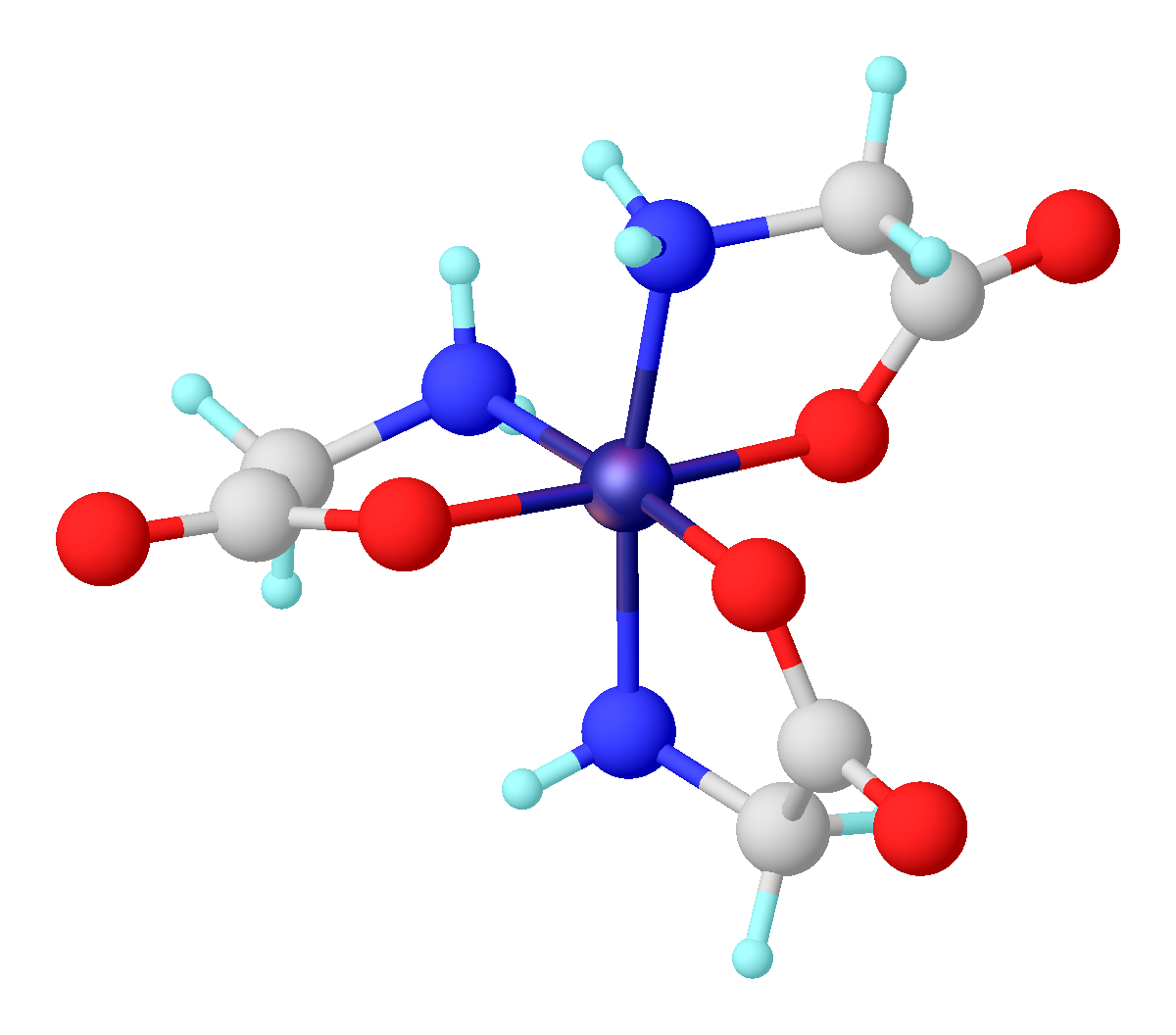
Solid state structure of mer-Co(glycinate)_{3} based on X-ray crystallography.

Both a meridional isomer and a facial isomer are known. In the former the Co-O bonds share a plane, and in the facial isomer they do not. Each of these two isomers exists also as pairs of stereoisomers, termed Δ and Λ. This set of compounds are prototypes of many tris(aminocarboxylate) complexes, with the notable distinction that the Co(III) derivatives do not isomerize readily and can thus be separated.

The violet isomer is obtained anhydrous, whereas the red derivative is the monohydrate. X-ray crystallographic characterization of the mer isomer demonstrates the existence of a dihydrate, however.

== Synthesis ==
The reaction of glycine with sodium tris(carbonato)cobalt(III) produces both the violet meridional and red-pink facial isomers in approximately equal amounts. The compounds are separated by fractional crystallization. These complexes have been characterized by X-ray crystallography.

The isomeric forms of tris(glycinato)cobalt(III) are poorly soluble in water. The solubility increases considerably in acidic solution.

== Other cobalt glycinates ==
Aside from the isomers of tris(glycinato)cobalt(III), several other cobalt(III) bis(glycinate) complexes are known. Some have the formula [Co(gly)_{2}L_{2}]^{+} (L_{2} = bipy and ethylenediamine) and [Co(gly)_{2}(NO_{2})_{2}]^{−}.

The cobalt(II) derivative Co(gly)_{2}(H_{2}O) has also been characterized.
