= Transition metal amide complex =

A transition metal amide complex may refer to:

- A transition metal carboxamide complex
- A transition metal inorganic amide
