= C2H6N2O =

The molecular formula C_{2}H_{6}N_{2}O (molar mass: 74.08 g/mol, exact mass: 74.0480 u) may refer to:

- Azoxymethane (AOM)
- Glycinamide
- N-Nitrosodimethylamine (NDMA), or DMN
