= Transition metal imidazole complex =

Class of chemical compounds

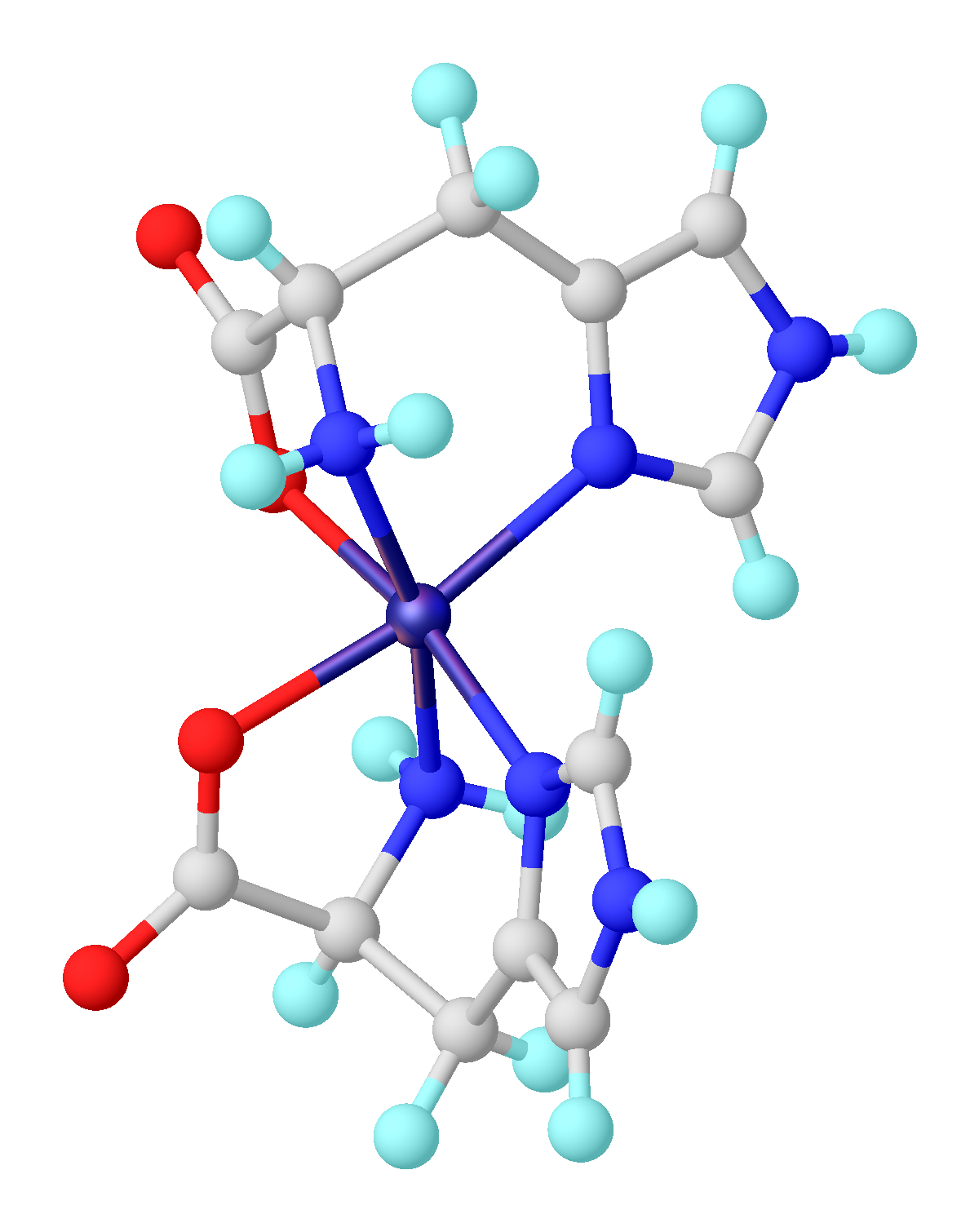
Structure of the histidine complex [Ni(κ^{3}-histidinate)_{2}]^{2-}.

A transition metal imidazole complex is a coordination complex that has one or more imidazole ligands. Complexes of imidazole itself are of little practical importance. In contrast, imidazole derivatives, especially histidine, are pervasive ligands in biology where they bind metal cofactors.

== Bonding and structure ==
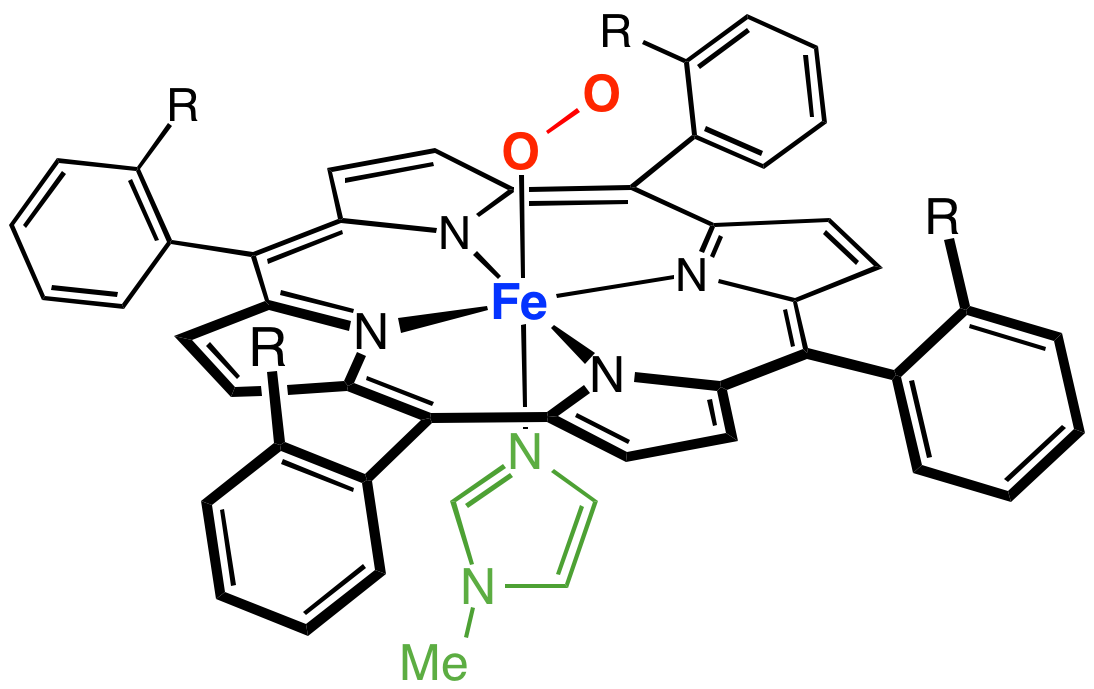
A "picket-fence porphyrin" complex of Fe, with axial coordination sites occupied by methylimidazole (green) and dioxygen. This synthetic complex mimics aspects of myoglobin.

Only the imine nitrogen (HC=N-CH) of imidazole is basic, and it is this nitrogen that binds to metal ions. Imidazole is a pure sigma-donor ligand. The pK_{a} of protonated imidazolium cation is about 6.95, which indicates that the basicity of imidazole is intermediate between pyridine (pK_{a} of pyridinium = 5.23) and ammonia (pK_{a} = 9,24 of ammonium). The donor properties of imidazole can also inferred from the redox properties of its complexes. It is classified as an L ligand in the Covalent bond classification method. In the usual electron counting method, it is a two-electron ligand.

Imidazole is classified as L ligand in the covalent bond classification method. In the usual electron counting method, it is a two-electron ligand. With respect to HSAB theory, imidazole can be classified as hard ligand. Nonetheless, complexes between low-valent metals and imidazole are well known, e.g., [Re(imidazole)_{3}(CO)_{3}]^{+}.

As a ligand, imidazole is compact and flat. The M-N(imidazole) bond is freely rotating. Six imidazole ligands fit comfortably around octahedral metal centers, e.g., [Fe(imidazole)_{6}]^{2+}.

Homoleptic octahedral complexes have been characterized by X-ray crystallography for the following dications: Fe^{2+}, Co^{2+}, Ni^{2+}, Zn^{2+}, Cd^{2+}. Hexakis complexes of both Ru^{2+} and Ru^{3+} are also known. Cu^{2+}, Pd^{2+}, and Pt^{2+} form homoleptic square planar complexes. Zn^{2+}, although crystallized as the hexakis complex, more typically forms a tetrahedral complex.

== Complexes of substituted imidazoles ==
Structure of vitamin b12, illustrating the dimethylbenzimidazole ligand

N-methylimidazole is slightly more basic than imidazole but is otherwise similar, if more lipophilic. Many salts of [M(imidazole-1-R)_{6}]^{2+} are known (R = alkyl, vinyl, etc.). 2-Methylimidazoles are somewhat bulky ligands owing to the steric clash between the 2-methyl group and other ligands in octahedral complexes.

A modified benzimidazole ligand is found in all versions of vitamin B12.

=== Histidine ===
Histidine complexes comprise an important subset of transition metal amino acid complexes. In common with other 4/5-substituted imidazoles, histidine can coordinate to metals via either of two nonequivalent tautomers. The free amino acid can coordinate through the imidazole and either or both of the carboxylate and amine.

The imidazole side chain of histidine residues in proteins are common binding sites for metal ions. Unlike the free amino acid, the histidine residue (i.e., as a component of a peptide or protein), coordinates solely via the imidazole substituent. Examples include myoglobin (Fe), carbonic anhydrase (Zn), azurin (Cu), and alpha-ketoglutarate-dependent hydroxylases (Fe). Polyhistidine-tag ("his tag") is an amino acid motif in proteins consisting of several histidine (His) residues that is attached to proteins to facilitate purification. The concept relies on the affinity of the imidazole side chain for metal cations.

== Reactions of imidazole ligands ==
Especially in cationic imidazole complexes, the N-H center is acidified. For tricationic d^{6} pentammines, deprotonation of the imidazole ligand gives imidazolate complexes with pK_{a} near 10 (M = Co, Rh, Ir):

[M(NH_{3})_{5}(N_{2}C_{3}H_{4})]^{3+} ⇌ [M(NH_{3})_{5}(N_{2}C_{3}H_{3})]^{2+} + H^{+}

The d^{5} complex [Ru(NH_{3})_{5}(N_{2}C_{3}H_{4})]^{3+} is more acidic, with a pK_{a} of 8.9. Thus, complexation to tricationic complexes acidify the pyrrolic NH center by at least 10,000.

Imidazole ligands are isomers of N-heterocyclic carbenes. This conversion has been observed:

[Ru(NH_{3})_{5}(N_{2}C_{3}H_{4})]^{2+} → [Ru(NH_{3})_{5}(C(NH)_{2}(CH)_{2})]^{2+}

== Imidazolate complexes ==
Structure of an imidazolate-bridged tricopper complex.

The pK_{a} of imidazole (to give imidazolate) is 14, thus it is easier to deprotonate than many other amines or imines. Many metal complexes feature imidazolate as a bridging ligand. One example of an imidazolate complex from biochemistry is found at the active site of copper-containing superoxide dismutase.

The M_{2}(μ-imidazolate) motif underpins materials comprising zeolitic imidazolate frameworks ("ZIF"s).
