= Transition metal amino acid complexes =

Transition metal amino acid complexes are a large family of coordination complexes containing the conjugate bases of the amino acids, the 2-aminocarboxylates. Amino acids are prevalent in nature, and all of them function as ligands toward the transition metals. Not emphasized in this article are complexes of amino acid amides (including peptide) and ester derivatives of amino acids.

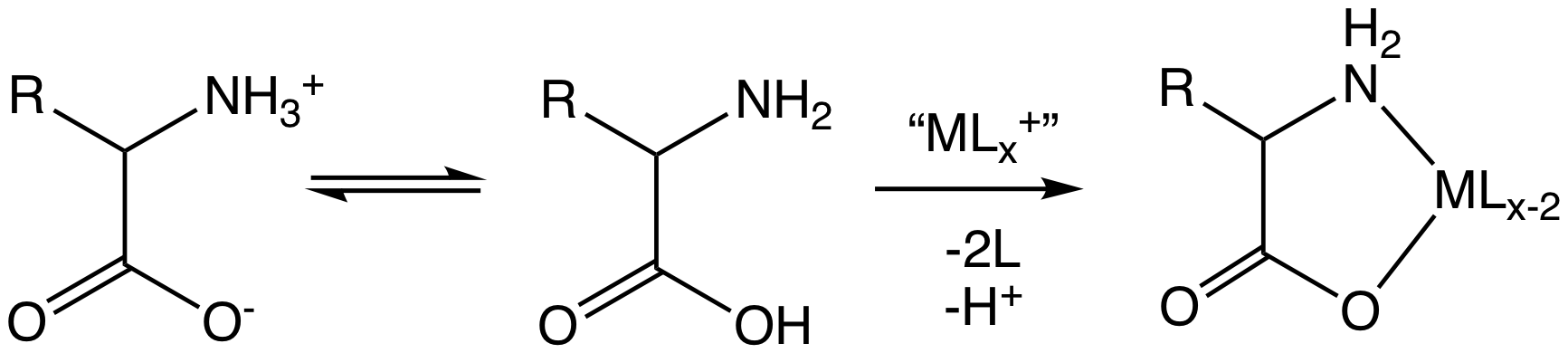

== Binding modes ==
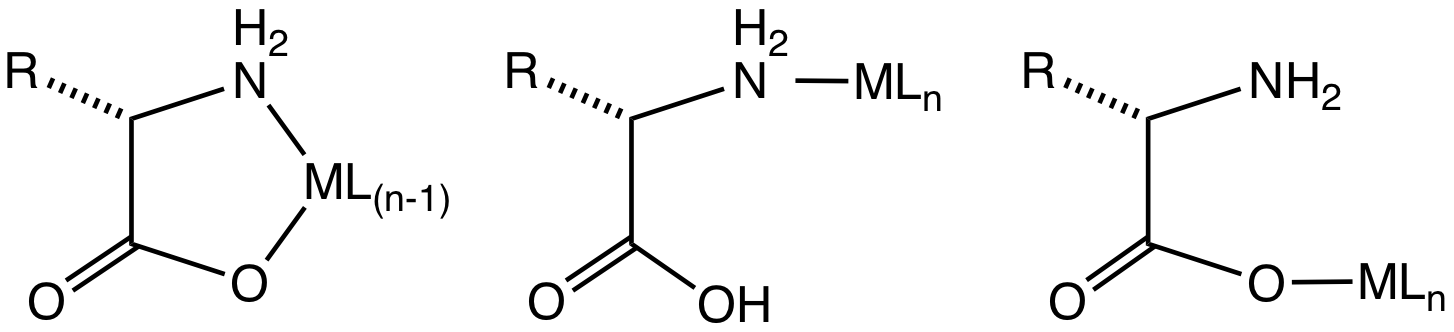
Three coordination modes for 2-aminocarboxylates and related ligands.

Commonly, amino acids coordinate to metal ions as N,O bidentate ligands, utilizing the amino group and the carboxylate. A five-membered chelate ring (NCCCOM) is formed. The chelate ring is only slightly ruffled at the sp^{3}-hybridized carbon and nitrogen centers. N,O bidentate amino carboxylates are "L-X" ligands in the Covalent bond classification method. With respect to HSAB theory, N,O bidentate amino carboxylate is a pair of hard ligands.

For those amino acids containing coordinating substituents, the resulting complexes are more structurally diverse since these substituents can coordinate. Histidine, aspartic acid, and methionine sometimes function as tridentate N,N,O-, N,O,O-, and S,N,O-ligands, respectively. Doubly deprotonated cysteine is often an N,S-bidentate ligand, with a non-coordinated carboxylate.

Using kinetically inert metal ions, complexes containing monodentate amino acids have been characterized. These complexes exist in either the N or the O linkage isomers.

== Stoichiometry and structure ==
Structures of selected complexes of amino acids
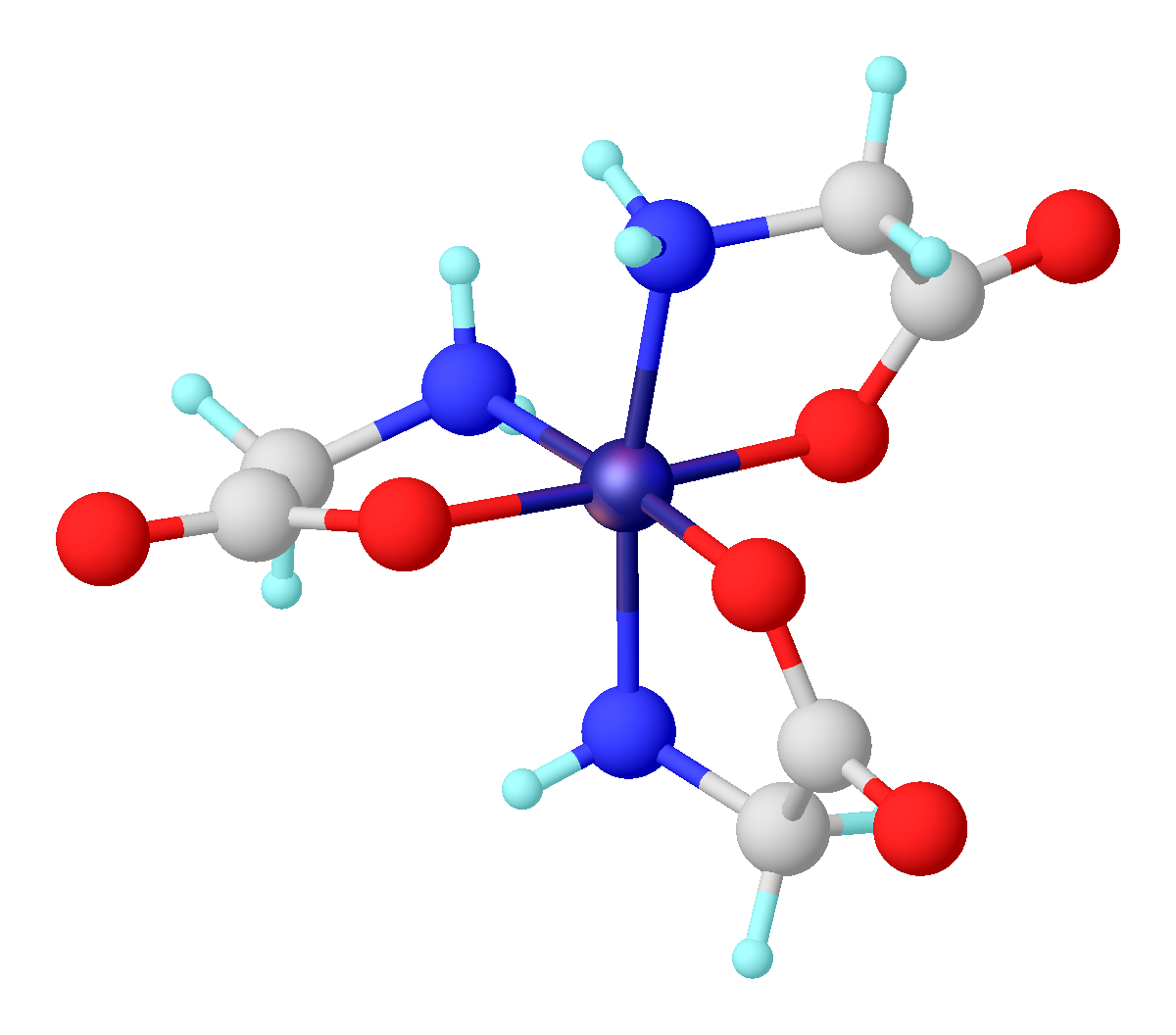
Co(glycinate)_{3}

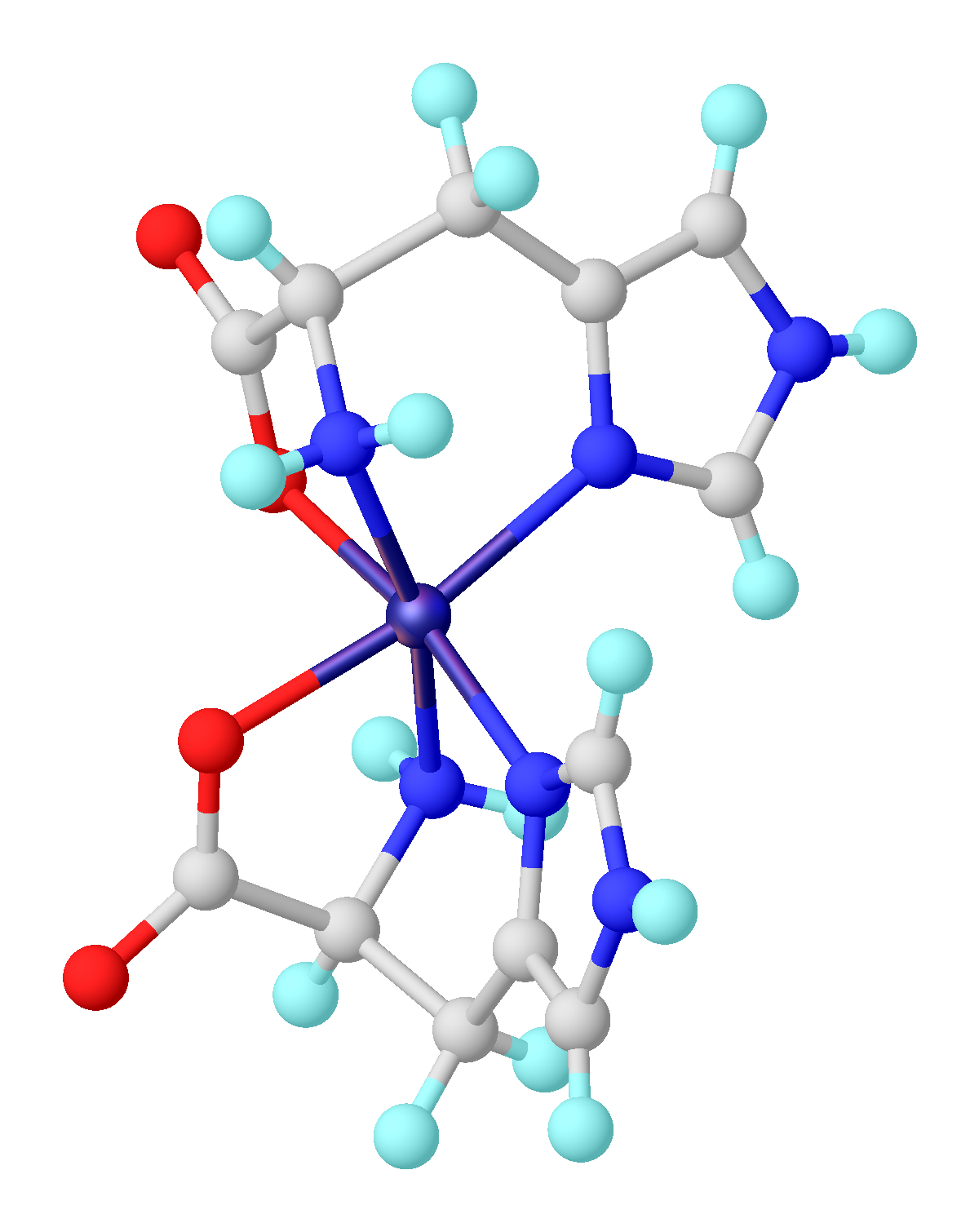
[Ni(κ^{3}-histidinate)_{2}]^{2-}

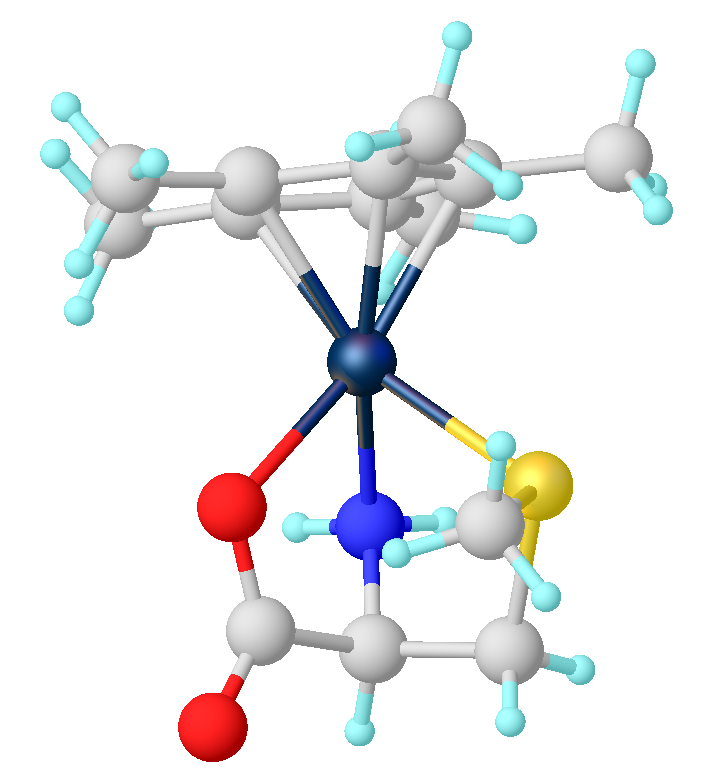
[Cp*Ir(κ^{3}-methionine)]^{+}

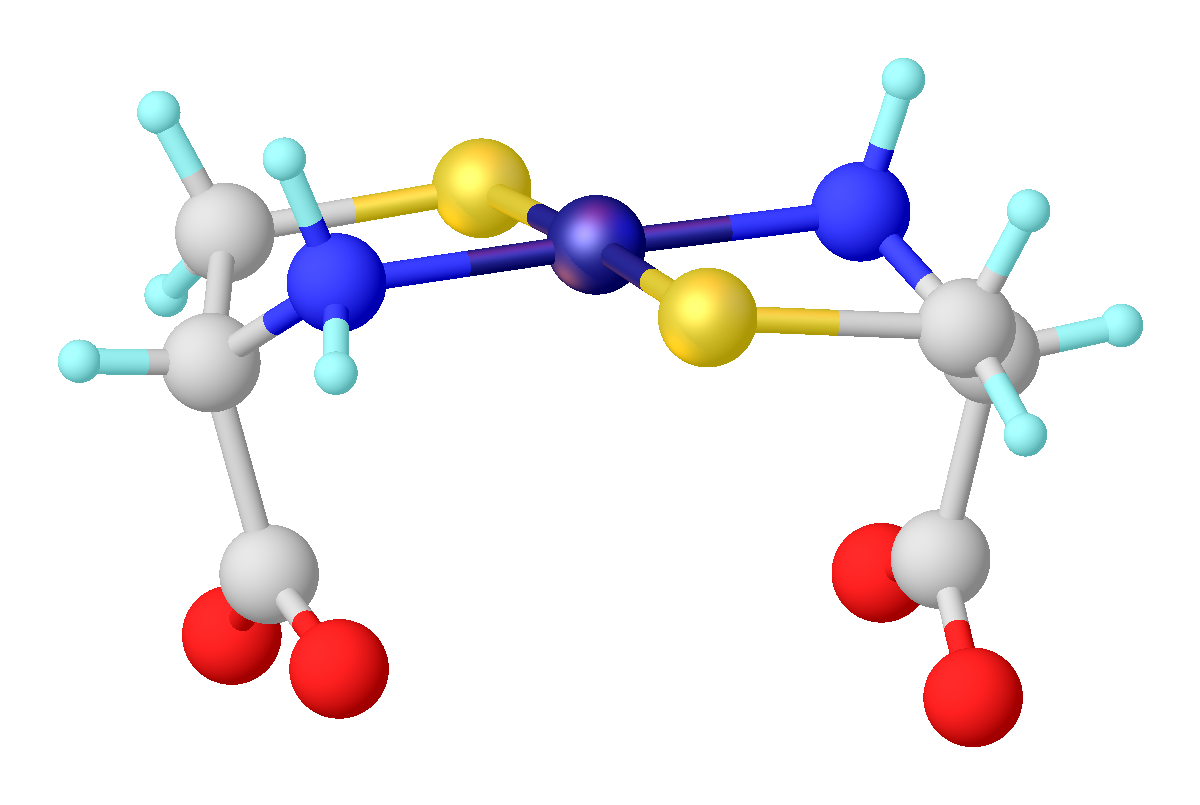
[Ni(cysteinate)_{2}]^{2-}

=== Homoleptic complexes (only amino acid ligands) ===
Mixing simple metal salts with solutions of amino acids near neutral or elevated pH often affords bis- or tris complexes. For metal ions that prefer octahedral coordination, these complexes often adopt the stoichiometry M(aa)_{3} (aa = amino carboxylate, such as glycinate, H_{2}NCH_{2}CO_{2}^{−}).

Complexes of the 3:1 stoichiometry have the formula [M(O_{2}CC(R)HNH_{2})_{3}]^{z}. Such complexes adopt octahedral coordination geometry. These complexes can exist in facial and meridional isomers, both of which are chiral. The stereochemical possibilities increase when the amino acid ligands are not homochiral. Both the violet meridional and red-pink facial isomers of tris(glycinato)cobalt(III) have been characterized With L-alanine, L-leucine, and other amino acids, one obtains four stereoisomers. With cysteine, the amino acid binds through N and thiolate.

Complexes with the 2:1 stoichiometry are illustrated by copper(II) glycinate [Cu(O_{2}CC(R)HNH_{2})_{2}], which akso exists as a pentacoordinate monohydrate. When the metal is square planar, these complexes can exist as cis and trans isomers. The stereochemical possibilities increase when the amino acid ligands are not homochiral. Homoleptic complexes are also known where the amino carboxylate is tridentate amino acids. One such complex is Ni(κ^{3}-histidinate)_{2}.

=== Peptides and proteins ===
In addition to the amino acids, peptides and proteins bind metal cofactors through their side chains. For the most part, the α-amino and carboxylate groups are unavailable for binding as they are otherwise engaged in the peptide bond. The situation is more complicated for the N-terminal and C-terminal residues where the carboxylate groups and α-amino are unavailable, respectively. Ignoring the N-and C-terminal sites, side chains of the individual residues function as ligands, e.g., histidine (imidazole), cysteine (thiolate), and methionine (thioether).

=== Heteroleptic complexes (amino acids plus other ligands) ===
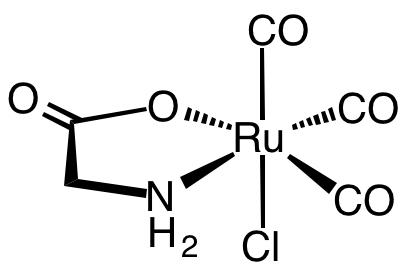
Structure of RuCl(gly)(CO)_{3}, known as CORM-3, is a CO-releasing drug.

Mixed ligand complexes are common for amino acids. Well known examples include [Co(en)_{2}(glycinate)]^{2+}, where en (ethylenediamine) is a spectator ligand. In the area of organometallic complexes, one example is the half-sandwich complex Cp*Ir(κ^{3}-methionine).

== Synthesis and reactions ==
Intramolecular route to Co glycinamide complex.

A well studied complex is tris(glycinato)cobalt(III). It is produced by the reaction of glycine with sodium tris(carbonato)cobalt(III). Similar synthetic methods apply to the preparation of tris(chelates) of other amino acids.

Commonly amino acid complexes are prepared by ligand displacement reactions of metal aquo complexes and the conjugate bases of amino acids:

[PtCl_{4}]^{2-} + 2 H_{2}NCH(R)CO_{2}^{−} → [Pt(H_{2}NCH(R)CO_{2})_{2}] + 4 Cl^{−}

Relevant to bioinorganic chemistry, amino acid complexes can be generated by the hydrolysis of amino acid esters and amides (en = ethylenediamine):

[(en)_{2}CoOH(κ^{1N}-H_{2}NCH(R)CO_{2}Et)]^{2+} → [(en)_{2}CoOH(κ^{2NO}-H_{2}NCH(R)CO_{2})]^{2+} + EtOH

Because their 5-membered MNC_{2}O chelate ring is rather stable, amino acid complexes represent protecting groups for amino acids, allowing diverse reactions of the side chains.

== Aminocarboxylate complexes ==
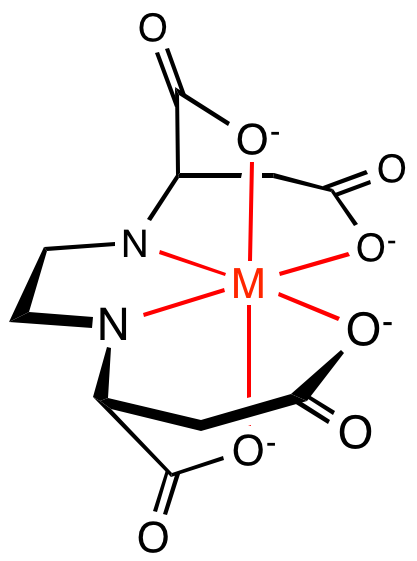
A complex of ethylenediamine-N,N'-disuccinic acid

Organic compounds featuring two or more 2- and 3-aminocarboxylate groups are ligands of extensive use in nature, industry, and research. Famous examples include EDTA and NTA.
