= Tris(acetylacetonato)cobalt(III) =

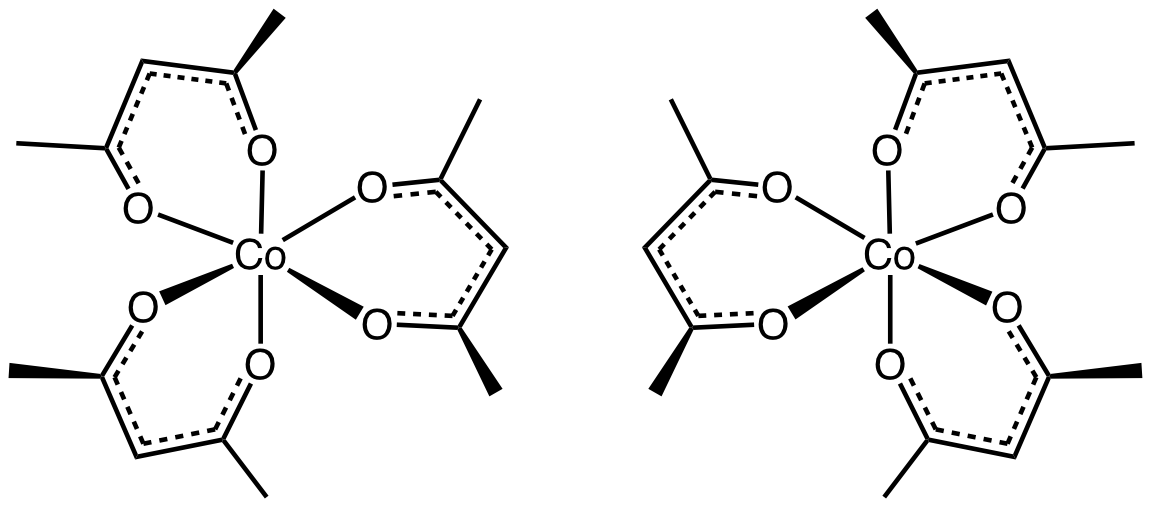

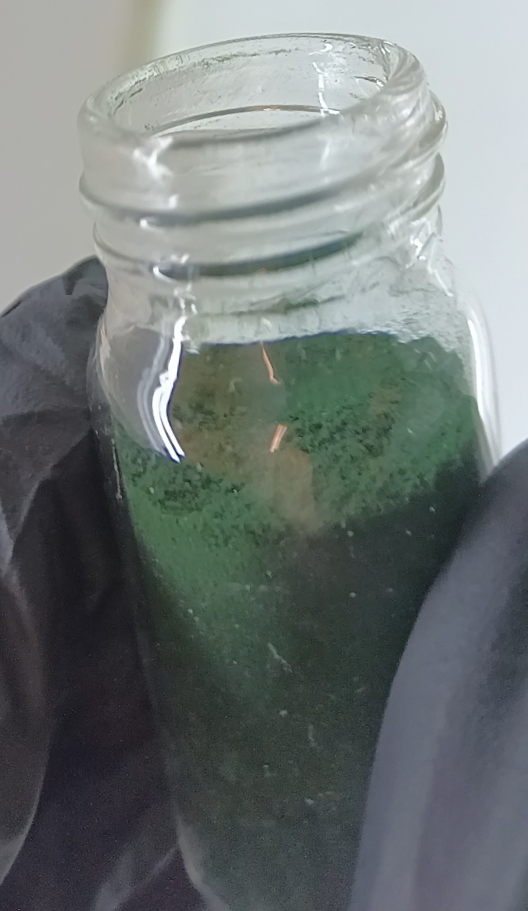

Names
- IUPAC name Tris(acetylacetonato)cobalt(III)
- Systematic IUPAC name Tris[(Z)-4-oxopent-2-en-2-olato-κ^{2}O,O′]cobalt(III)
- Other names Cobalt(III) acetylacetonate, tris(acac) cobalt

Identifiers
CAS Number	21679-46-9
3D model (JSmol)	Interactive image
ChemSpider	4589065
ECHA InfoCard	100.040.464
EC Number	244-527-6
PubChem CID	24884269
UNII	6Q3A69X2F2
CompTox Dashboard (EPA)	DTXSID30893462
- InChI: InChI=1S/3C5H8O2.Co/c3*1-4(6)3-5(2)7;/h3*3,6H,1-2H3;/q;;;+3/p-3/b3*4-3+; Key: RHCQEPWEBDOALW-MUCWUPSWSA-K
- SMILES: C/C(=C\C(=O)C)/[O-].C/C(=C\C(=O)C)/[O-].C/C(=C\C(=O)C)/[O-].[Co+3]

Properties
Chemical formula	C_{15}H_{21}CoO_{6}
Molar mass	356.260 g·mol^{−1}
Appearance	green solid
Density	1.41 g/cm^{3}
Melting point	213 °C (415 °F; 486 K)

Hazards
- GHS labelling
Pictograms	(GHS07: Exclamation mark) (GHS08: Health hazard)
Signal word	Danger
Hazard statements	H302, H317, H334
Precautionary statements	P261, P264, P270, P272, P280, P285, P301+P312, P302+P352, P304+P341, P321, P330, P333+P313, P342+P311, P363, P501
- Except where otherwise noted, data are given for materials in their standard state (at 25 °C [77 °F], 100 kPa). Infobox references

Tris(acetylacetonato)cobalt(III) is the coordination complex with the formula Co(C_{5}H_{7}O_{2})_{3}. Often abbreviated Co(acac)_{3}, it is a green, diamagnetic solid that is soluble in organic solvents, but not in water. Owing to its solubility in organic solvents, tris(acetylacetonato)cobalt(III) is used to produce homogeneous catalysts by reduction.

== Structure ==
The structure of the complex has been confirmed by X-ray crystallography. The three acac^{−} ligands bind in a bidentate fashion to cobalt, defining an octahedral complex. The solid is isomorphous with tris(acetylacetonato)iron(III), tris(acetylacetonato)manganese(III), and tris(acetylacetonato)aluminium. With D_{3}-symmetry, these complexes are chiral and often can be resolved into the individual enantiomers.

== Synthesis and reactions ==
Tris(acetylacetonato)cobalt(III) is prepared by the reaction of cobalt(II) carbonate and acetylacetone in the presence of hydrogen peroxide:

2 CoCO_{3} + 6 CH_{3}COCH_{2}COCH_{3} + H_{2}O_{2} → 2 Co(O_{2}C_{3}Me_{2}H)_{3} + 2 CO_{2} + 4 H_{2}O

One distinctive aspect of Co(acac)_{3} is its susceptibility toward electrophilic aromatic substitution, by which protons on the central carbon are replaced with diverse electrophiles (Me = methyl):

Co(O_{2}C_{3}Me_{2}H)_{3} + 3 NO_{2}^{+} → Co(O_{2}C_{3}Me_{2}NO_{2})_{3} + 3 H^{+}
