= Carbonatobis(ethylenediamine)cobalt(III) chloride =

Identifiers
CAS Number	15842-50-9
3D model (JSmol)	Interactive image
PubChem CID	139054019
CompTox Dashboard (EPA)	DTXSID601336977
- InChI: InChI=1S/2C2H8N2.CH2O3.ClH.Co/c2*3-1-2-4;2-1(3)4;;/h2*1-4H2;(H2,2,3,4);1H;/q;;;;+3/p-3 Key: JVHWBGXYXBWMPO-UHFFFAOYSA-K
- SMILES: C(CN)N.C(CN)N.C(=O)([O-])[O-].[Cl-].[Co+3]

Properties
Chemical formula	C_{5}H_{16}ClCoN_{4}O_{3}
Molar mass	274.59 g·mol^{−1}
Appearance	red solid
Density	1.79 g/cm^{3}
- Except where otherwise noted, data are given for materials in their standard state (at 25 °C [77 °F], 100 kPa). Infobox references

Carbonatobis(ethylenediamine)cobalt(III) chloride is a salt with the formula [CoCO_{3}(en)_{2}]Cl (en = ethylenediamine). It is a red diamagnetic solid that is soluble in water. It is the monochloride salt of a cationic carbonate complex [CoCO_{3}(en)_{2}]^{+}. The chloride ion in this salt readily undergoes ion exchange. The compound is synthesized by the oxidation of a mixture of cobalt(II) chloride, lithium hydroxide, and ethylenediamine in the presence of carbon dioxide:

CoCl_{2} + 2 en + CO_{2} + 0.5 H_{2}O_{2} + LiOH → [CoCO_{3}(en)_{2}]Cl + H_{2}O + LiCl

The cationic complex is octahedral with C_{2} symmetry.

The carbonato ligand is readily replaced upon acid hydrolysis. Derivatives include the following complexes: cis- and trans-[CoCl_{2}(en)_{2}]^{+}, cis-[Co(OH)(H_{2}O)_{3}(en)_{2}]^{2+}, cis-[Co(OH_{2})_{2}(en)_{2}]^{+}, and cis-[Co(NO_{2})_{2}(en)_{2}]^{+}. Reaction with trifluoromethanesulfonic acid (HOTf) gives [Co(OTf)_{2}(en)_{2}]OTf.
