= Trans-Dichlorobis(ethylenediamine)cobalt(III) chloride =

trans-Dichlorobis(ethylenediamine)cobalt(III) chloride
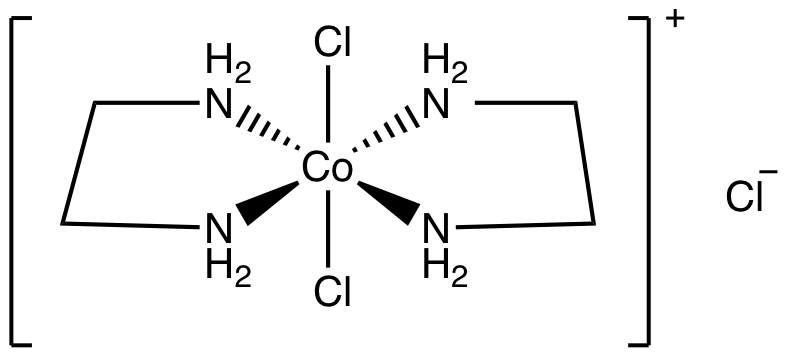

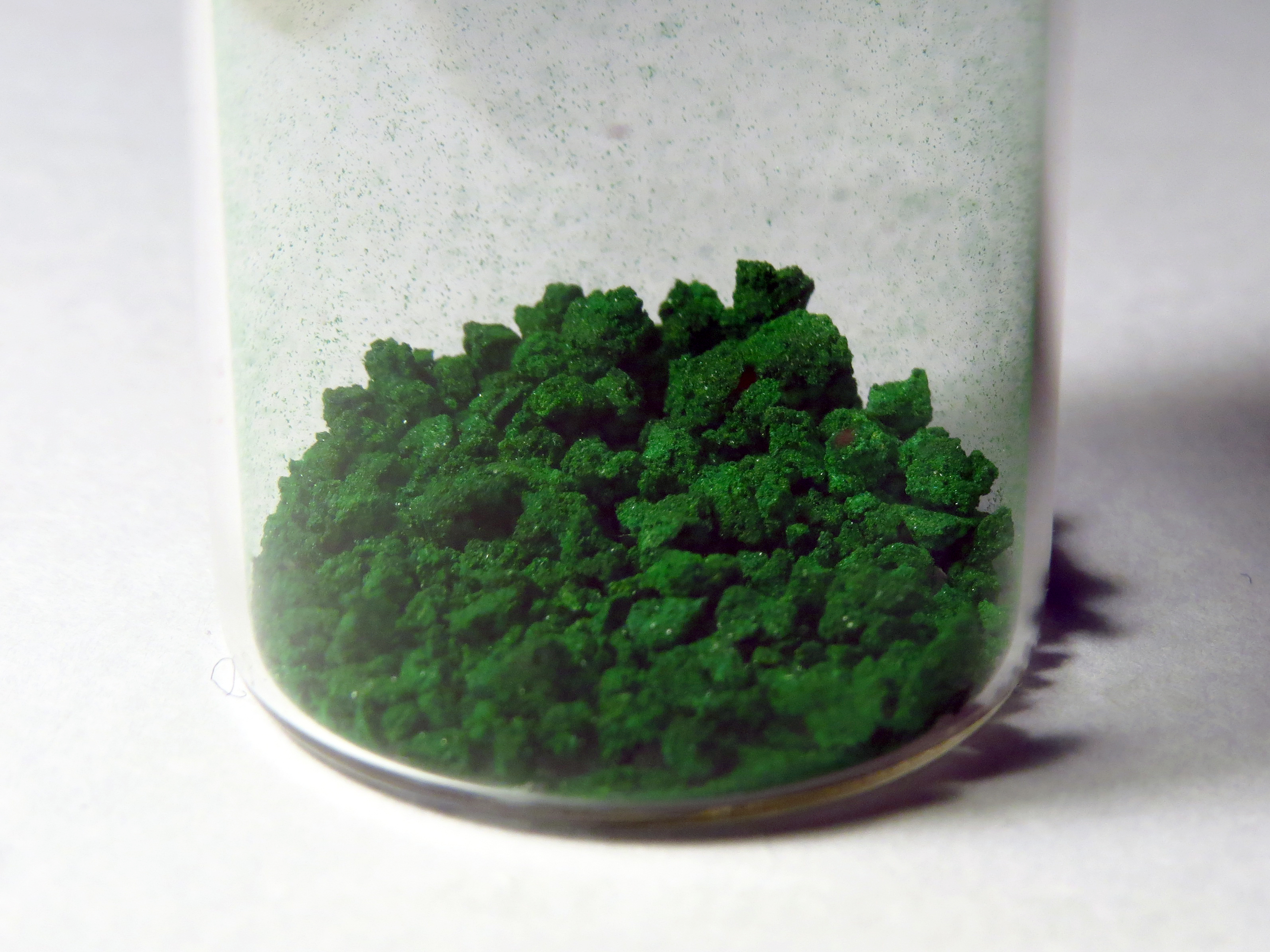

Names
- IUPAC name (OC-6-12′)-Dichloridobis(ethane-1,2-diamine-κ^{2}N,N′)cobalt(1+) chloride(1−)

Identifiers
CAS Number	13408-72-5
3D model (JSmol)	Interactive image
ChemSpider	62872697
PubChem CID	12127156
- InChI: InChI=1S/2C2H8N2.3ClH.Co/c2*3-1-2-4;;;;/h2*1-4H2;3*1H;/q;;;;;+3/p-3 Key: GVMSQWCTZLHSQH-UHFFFAOYSA-K
- SMILES: C(CN)N.C(CN)N.Cl[Co](Cl)Cl

Properties
Chemical formula	C_{4}H_{16}Cl_{3}CoN_{4}
Molar mass	285.48 g·mol^{−1}
Appearance	green solid
Melting point	decomposes
Solubility in water	good

Hazards
- GHS labelling
Pictograms	(GHS07: Exclamation mark)
Signal word	Warning
Hazard statements	H315, H319, H335
Precautionary statements	P261, P305+P351+P338
- Except where otherwise noted, data are given for materials in their standard state (at 25 °C [77 °F], 100 kPa). verify (what is ?) Infobox references

trans-Dichlorobis(ethylenediamine)cobalt(III) chloride is a salt with the formula [CoCl_{2}(en)_{2}]Cl (en = ethylenediamine). It is a green diamagnetic solid that is soluble in water. It is the monochloride salt of the cationic coordination complex [CoCl_{2}(en)_{2}]^{+}. One chloride ion in this salt readily undergoes ion exchange but the two other chlorides are less reactive, being bound to the metal center. The more stable cis-dichlorobis(ethylenediamine)cobalt(III) chloride is also known.

== Synthesis ==
The compound is synthesized by the reaction of cobalt(II) chloride and ethylenediamine in hydrochloric acid in the presence of oxygen:

4 CoCl_{2} + 8 en + 4 HCl + O_{2} → 4 trans-[CoCl_{2}(en)_{2}]Cl + 2 H_{2}O

The initial product contains HCl, which is removed by heating. Alternatively, (carbonato)bis(ethylenediamine)cobalt(III) chloride reacts with hydrochloric acid at 10 °C to give the same species.

[Co(CO_{3})(en)_{2}]Cl + 2 HCl → trans-[CoCl_{2}(en)_{2}]Cl + CO_{2} + H_{2}O

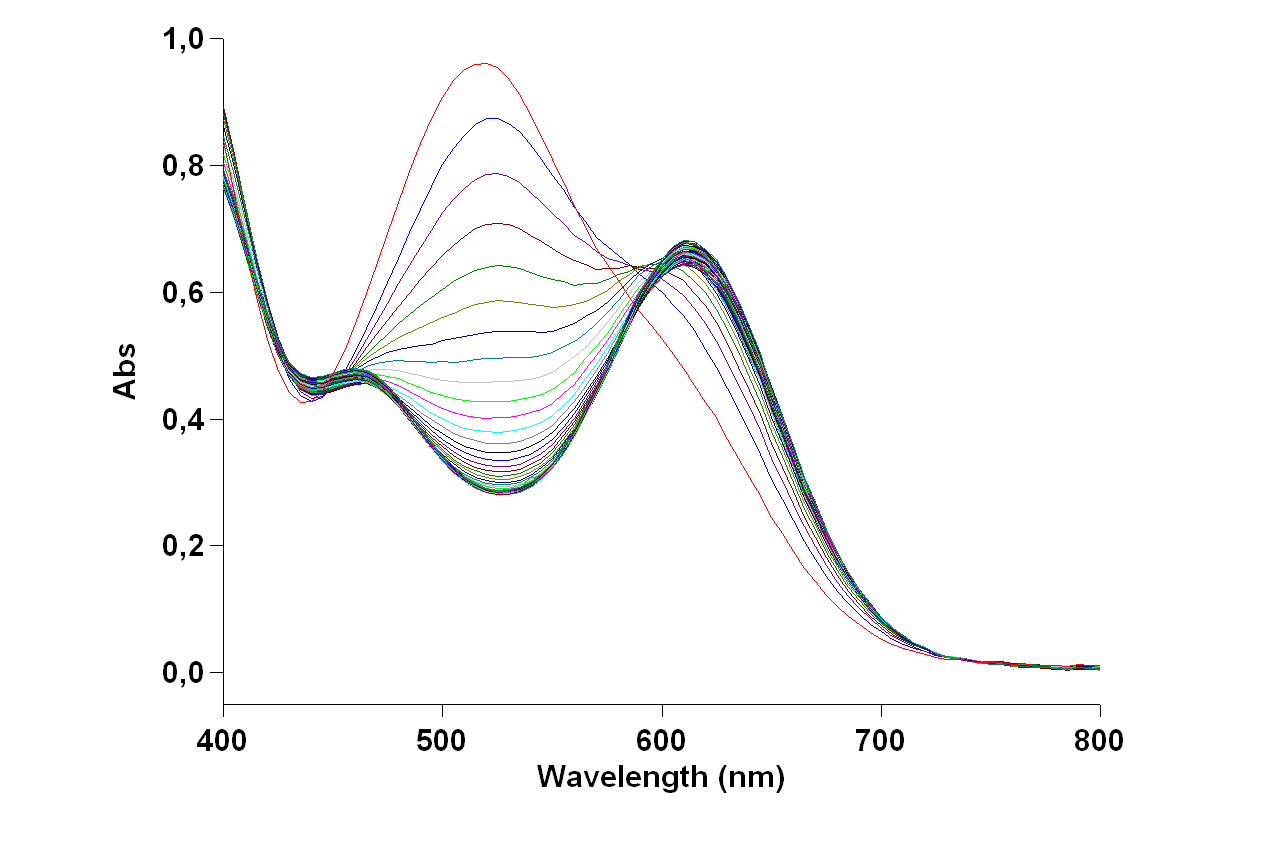
UV-vis spectra of various stages in the conversion of trans-[CoCl_{2}(en)_{2}]^{+} to the cis isomer.

== Related complexes ==
This salt is more soluble than cis-dichlorobis(ethylenediamine)cobalt(III) chloride. This pair of isomers were significant in the development of the area of coordination chemistry. The chiral cis isomer is obtained by heating the trans isomer. Both isomers of dichlorobis(ethylenediamine)cobalt(III) have often been used in stereochemical studies. The trans isomer cation has idealized D_{2h} point group symmetry, whereas the cis isomer cation has C_{2} symmetry.

Tris(ethylenediamine)cobalt(III) chloride in contrast to the bis(ethylenediamine) complexes does not undergo substitution.
