= Spherocobaltite =

Cobalt carbonate mineral

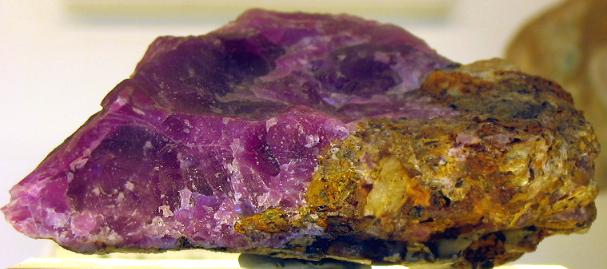
- Spherocobaltite from Peramea, Lérida, Catalonia, Spain

General
- Category: Carbonate mineral
- Formula: CoCO_{3}
- IMA symbol: Scbt
- Strunz classification: 5.AB.05
- Crystal system: Trigonal
- Crystal class: Hexagonal scalenohedral (3̅m); H-M symbol: (3̅ 2/m)
- Space group: R3̅c
- Unit cell: a = 4.65, c = 14.95 [Å]; Z = 6

Identification
- Formula mass: 118.94 g/mol
- Color: Most commonly dark magenta red; pink to red, brown, brownish red, grey, greyish red, velvet-black (due to surface alteration)
- Crystal habit: Encrustations - forms crust-like aggregates on matrix, crystals uncommon: rhombohedral to discoidal
- Cleavage: Perfect rhomboidal cleavage
- Mohs scale hardness: 4
- Luster: Vitreous
- Streak: Pink
- Diaphaneity: Transparent to translucent
- Specific gravity: 4.13
- Optical properties: Uniaxial (–)
- Refractive index: n_{ε} = 1.600, n_{ω} = 1.885
- Birefringence: 0.285
- Pleochroism: Dichroic: O = violet-red; E = rose-red

Spherocobaltite or sphaerocobaltite is the mineral form of Cobalt(II) carbonate (CoCO_{3}). It is a cobalt bearing member of the calcite group of carbonate minerals, crystallizing in the trigonal crystal system. Rare specimens of pure spherocobaltite typically show a rose-red color, but the color range of impure specimens extends to shades of pink and pale brown.

== Discovery and occurrence ==
Spherocobaltite was first described in 1877 for an occurrence within cobalt and nickel veins in the St. Daniel Mine of the Schneeberg District, Ore Mountains, Saxony, Germany. The name is from the Greek "sphaira", sphere, and cobalt, in reference to its typical crystal habit and composition. It occurs within hydrothermal cobalt-bearing mineral deposits as a rare phase associated with roselite, erythrite, annabergite and cobalt rich calcite and dolomite.

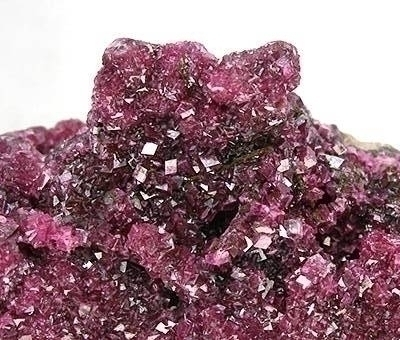
Cluster of spherocobaltite crystals from the Katanga Copper Crescent, Katanga (Shaba), Democratic Republic of Congo (size: 11.5 x 6.0 x 4.5 cm)
