= Cis-Dichlorobis(ethylenediamine)cobalt(III) chloride =

cis-Dichlorobis(ethylenediamine)cobalt(III) chloride
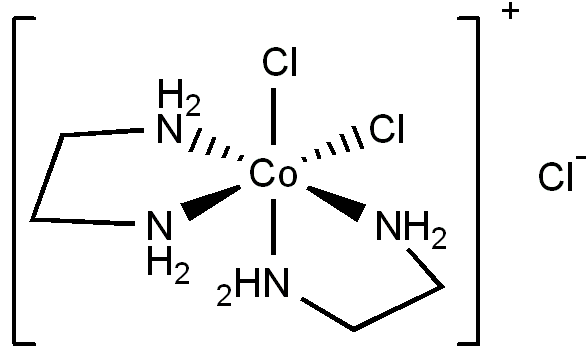

Identifiers
CAS Number	14040-32-5
3D model (JSmol)	Interactive image
ChemSpider	360279
PubChem CID	166987
- InChI: InChI=1S/2C2H6N2.2ClH.Co/c2*3-1-2-4;;;/h2*3-4H,1-2H2;2*1H;/q2*-2;;;+2/p-2 Key: LBGRXLRZGLIOLI-UHFFFAOYSA-L; InChI=1/2C2H6N2.2ClH.Co/c2*3-1-2-4;;;/h2*3-4H,1-2H2;2*1H;/q2*-2;;;+2/p-2 Key: LBGRXLRZGLIOLI-NUQVWONBAE
- SMILES: Cl[Co]Cl.[NH-]CC[NH-].[NH-]CC[NH-]

Properties
Chemical formula	C_{4}H_{16}Cl_{3}CoN_{4}
Molar mass	285.48 g·mol^{−1}
Appearance	violet solid
Melting point	decomposes
Solubility in water	good

Hazards
- GHS labelling
Pictograms	(GHS07: Exclamation mark)
Signal word	Warning
Hazard statements	H315, H319, H335
Precautionary statements	P261, P264, P271, P280, P302+P352, P304+P340, P305+P351+P338, P312, P321, P332+P313, P337+P313, P362, P403+P233, P405, P501
- Except where otherwise noted, data are given for materials in their standard state (at 25 °C [77 °F], 100 kPa). verify (what is ?) Infobox references

cis-Dichlorobis(ethylenediamine)cobalt(III) chloride is a salt with the formula [CoCl_{2}(en)_{2}]Cl (en = ethylenediamine). The salt consists of a cationic coordination complex and a chloride anion. It is a violet diamagnetic solid that is soluble in water. One chloride ion in this salt readily undergoes ion exchange, but the two other chlorides are less reactive, being bound to the metal center.

== Synthesis and optical resolution ==
Cis-dichlorobis(ethylenediamine)cobalt(III) chloride is obtained by heating a solution of trans-dichlorobis(ethylenediamine)cobalt(III) chloride, e.g. using a steam bath.

The racemate can be resolved into two enantiomers (Λ and Δ) by the formation of the d-α-bromocamphor-π-sulfonate salt. The diastereomeric salts are separated by recrystallization. After their purification, the individual diastereomers are converted back to the chloride salt by reaction with ice cold hydrochloric acid.

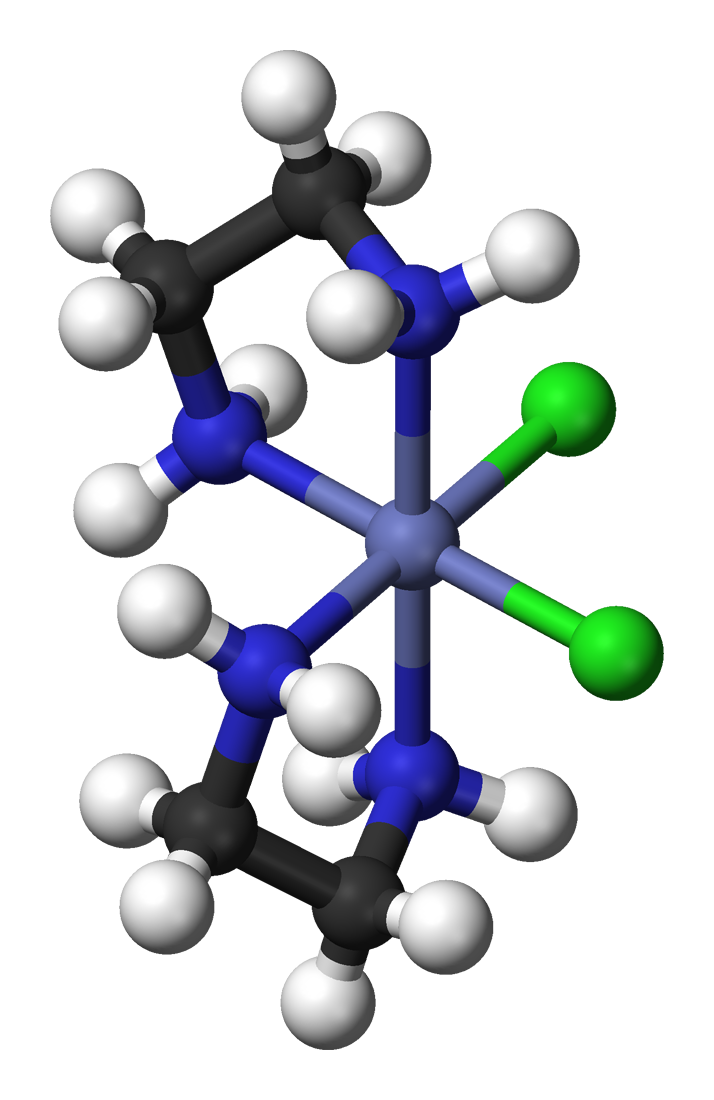
Λ-cis-[CoCl_{2}(en)_{2}]^{+}

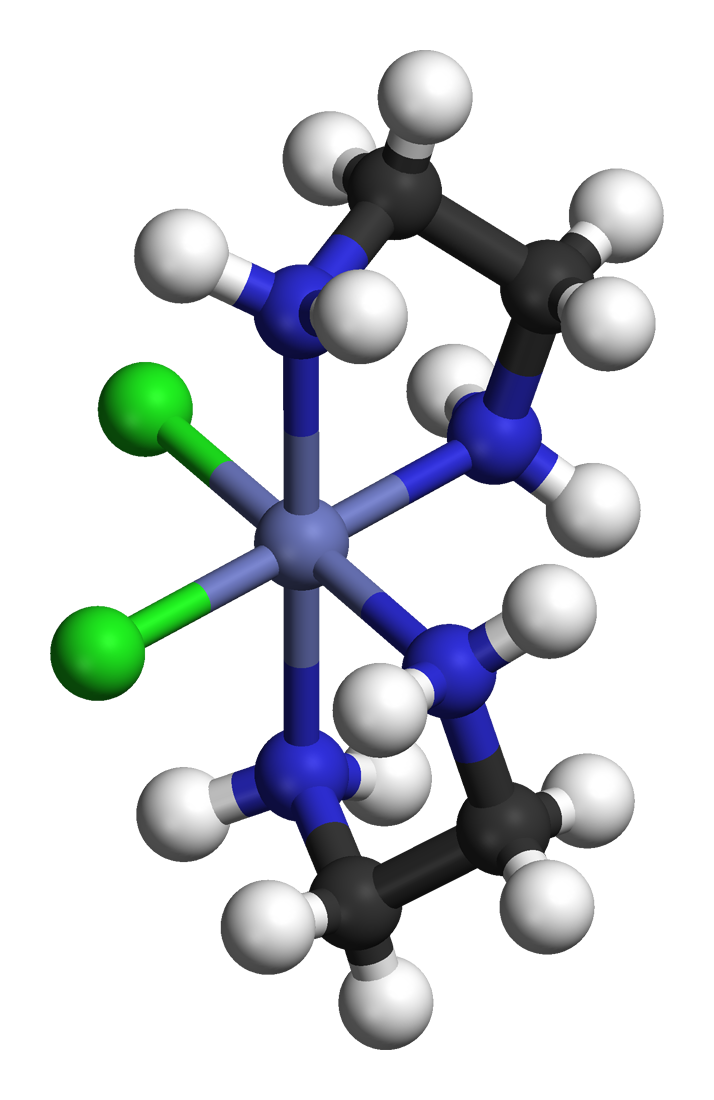
Δ-cis-[CoCl_{2}(en)_{2}]^{+}

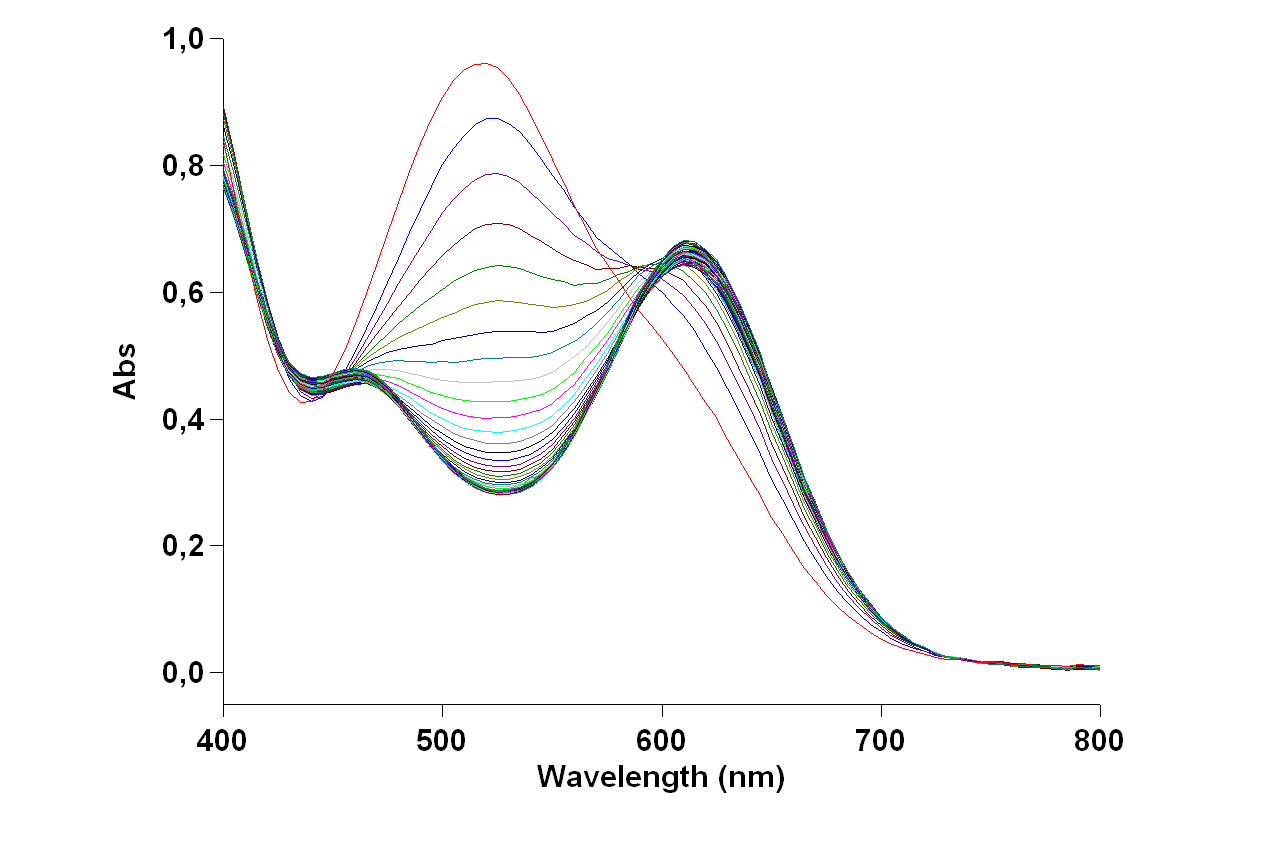
UV-vis spectra of various stages in the conversion of trans-[CoCl_{2}(en)_{2}]^{+} to the cis isomer.

This salt is less soluble than its dull-green isomer trans-dichlorobis(ethylenediamine)cobalt(III) chloride. This pair of isomers were significant in the development of the area of coordination chemistry. The chiral cis isomer is obtained by heating the trans isomer. Both isomers of dichlorobis(ethylenediamine)cobalt(III) have often been used in stereochemical studies.

== Related complexes ==
- Tris(ethylenediamine)cobalt(III) chloride
