= Transition metal carboxamide complex =

Transition metal carboxamide complexes are coordination complexes containing one or more amide ligands (RC(O)NH_{2} being the simplest members) bound to a transition metal. Many amides are known, proteins for example. Amides are generally at least weakly basic, so the inventory of their coordination complexes is large. Amide complexation is an important structural motif in bioinorganic chemistry. This binding is also relevant to catalysis, since metal-amide complexes are intermediates in the metal-catalyzed hydrolysis of amides to carboxylic acids.

== Ligand properties ==
Several principles and trends are illustrated by the case of complexes of dimethylformamide (DMF), a very common amide ligand. Amides bind to metals through oxygen, which is the basic site of amides. Amides are thus L ligands according to the covalent bond classification method, i.e. charge-neutral 2e donors. With respect to HSAB theory, amides are classified as hard ligands.

The M-O=C(NH_{2})H entity is planar in complexes of formamide. Similarly, the M-O=C(NC_{2})H entity is planar in complexes of DMF. Two geometrically distinct bonding modes are possible depending on the relative positions of the metal ion and the N-substituent on the amide. For simple unidentate amides, like DMF, the M and N are transoid.

=== Nomenclature ===
Often amide refers to carboxamide, and often amide refers to the anions R_{2}N^{-} and their derivatives. Tetrakis(dimethylamido)titanium (Ti(N(CH_{3})_{2})_{4}) illustrates the ambiguity of the terminology.

== Homoleptic complexes ==
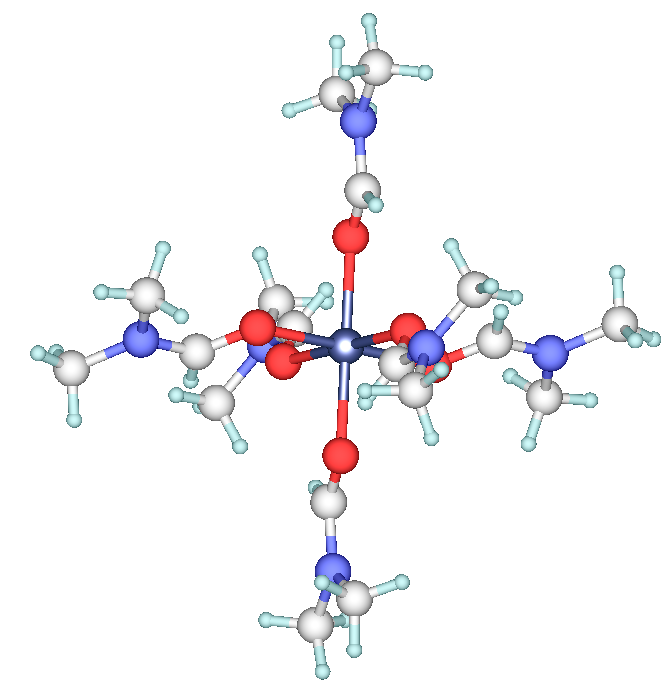
Structure of the dication in the salt [Ru(dmf)_{6}]^{2+}(^{-}O_{3}SCF_{3})_{2}. Selected distances: Ru-O, 2.089, C-O, 1.22, C-N, 1.32 Å. Color code: red = O, blue = N, gray = C. The structure of the cation is very similar for the related Ru(III) salt, except that the Ru-O distance is 2.02 Å.

Being a compact ligand, DMF forms homoleptic complexes with several metal cations. Some of those characterized by X-ray crystallography are listed below.

- [Mn(DMF)_{6}](BPh_{4})_{2}
- [Fe(DMF)_{6}](B(CN)_{4})_{2}
- [Co(DMF)_{6}]I_{2}
- [Ni(DMF)_{6}](BPh_{4})_{2}
- [Zn(DMF)_{6}](BPh_{4})_{2}
- [Ru(DMF)_{6}](O_{3}SCF_{3})_{2}
- [Ru(DMF)_{6}](O_{3}SCF_{3})_{3}
- [Cd(DMF)_{6}]B_{12}H_{12}

By contrast with DMF, homoleptic complexes with formamide and methylformamide are rare.

== Chelating amide ligands ==
Diacetamide (HN(C(O)CH_{3})_{2}) and glycinamide (H_{2}NC(O)CH_{2}NH_{2}) are two of many examples of chelating amide ligands. They respectively form the complexes [Co((HN(COCH_{3})_{2}(SCN)2}} and ([Co(H_{2}NCOCH_{2}NH_{2})(H_{2}NCH_{2}CH_{2}NH_{2})_{2}]^{3+}.

== Proteins and peptides ==
Some prominent examples of transition metal complexes of carboxamido (deprotonated carboxamide) ligands: bleomycin (Fe), Nickel superoxide dismutase (Ni), and nitrile hydratase (Co).

== Reactions ==
The amide ligand in cationic complexes is prone toward hydrolysis:

[Co(NH_{3})_{5}(OCH(NMe_{2})]^{3+} + OH^{−} → [Co(NH_{3})_{5}(O_{2}CH]^{2+} + HNMe_{2} (Me = CH_{3})

The N-H bonds in amide ligands are acidified relative to the free ligand. Consequently, amide complexes are susceptible to deprotonation. This conversion is often accompanied by isomerization to the N-bonded form. This form of linkage isomerism is manifested in glycinamide complexes.

Acid-base reaction of a dicationic glycinamide complex (L = arbitrary ligand).

== Ureas ==
Urea (O=C(NH_{2})_{2}) is more basic at oxygen than simple amides owing to the combined pi-donation from the two amino groups. One consequence is that the inventory of urea complexes is large, including many homoleptic derivatives. Urea forms a broader range of complexes, reflected by the existence of [M(urea)_{6}](ClO_{4})_{3} (M = Ti, Mn). As for other complexes of carboxamide ligands, the MOC(NH_{2})_{2} core of urea is planar with a bent M-O-C angle.

Biuret (H_{2}NC(O)N(H)C(O)NH_{2}) is a derivative of urea but with two amido groups. Biuret forms a variety of metal complexes, e.g. [Cu(H_{2}NC(O)NHC(O)NH_{2})_{2}]^{2+}. In addition to the parent urea and biuret, many derivatives are known where N-H is replaced by alkyl or aryl.
