= Glycinamide =

Names
- Preferred IUPAC name 2-Aminoacetamide

Identifiers
| CAS Number | 598-41-4; 1668-10-6 (HCl) |
| 3D model (JSmol) | Interactive image |
| Beilstein Reference | 635783 |
| ChEBI | CHEBI:42843 |
| ChEMBL | ChEMBL86954 |
| ChemSpider | 62242 |
| DrugBank | DB03636 |
| ECHA InfoCard | 100.009.031 |
| EC Number | 209-932-4 |
| PubChem CID | 69020 |
| UNII | 4JDT453NWO |
| CompTox Dashboard (EPA) | DTXSID1060508 |
- InChI: InChI=1S/C2H6N2O/c3-1-2(4)5/h1,3H2,(H2,4,5) Key: BEBCJVAWIBVWNZ-UHFFFAOYSA-N
- SMILES: C(C(=O)N)N

Properties
| Chemical formula | C_{2}H_{6}N_{2}O |
| Molar mass | 74.083 g·mol^{−1} |
| Appearance | white solid |
| Melting point | 65–67 °C (149–153 °F; 338–340 K) |
| Boiling point | decomposes |
| Solubility in water | good |
- Except where otherwise noted, data are given for materials in their standard state (at 25 °C [77 °F], 100 kPa). Infobox references

Glycinamide is an organic compound with the molecular formula H_{2}NCH_{2}C(O)NH_{2}. It is the amide derivative of the amino acid glycine. It is a water-soluble, white solid. Amino acid amides, such as glycinamide are prepared by treating the amino acid ester with ammonia.

It is a ligand for transition metals, related to amino acid complexes. As a neutral ligand, it binds through the amine. In some complexes, it binds through the amine and the carbonyl oxygen, forming a five-membered chelate ring.

The hydrochloride salt of glycinamide, glycinamide hydrochloride, is one of Good's buffers with a pH in the physiological range. Glycinamide hydrochloride has a pKa near the physiological pH (8.20 at 20°C), making it useful in cell culture work. Its ΔpKa/°C is -0.029 and it has a solubility in water at 0 °C of 6.4 M.

Glycinamide is a reagent used in the synthesis of glycineamide ribonucleotide (an intermediate in de novo purine biosynthesis).
