= Transition metal carbonate and bicarbonate complexes =

Cobalt(III) carbonato complexes, like the chiral octahedral cation in this image, have been well studied.

Transition metal carbonate and bicarbonate complexes are coordination compounds containing carbonate (CO^{2−}_{3}) and bicarbonate (HCO^{−}_{3}) as ligands. The inventory of complexes is large, enhanced by the fact that the carbonate ligand can bind metal ions in a variety of bonding modes. They illustrate one fate of low-valence complexes when exposed to air.

== Bonding modes ==
=== Carbonate ===
Common bonding modes for carbonate ligands.

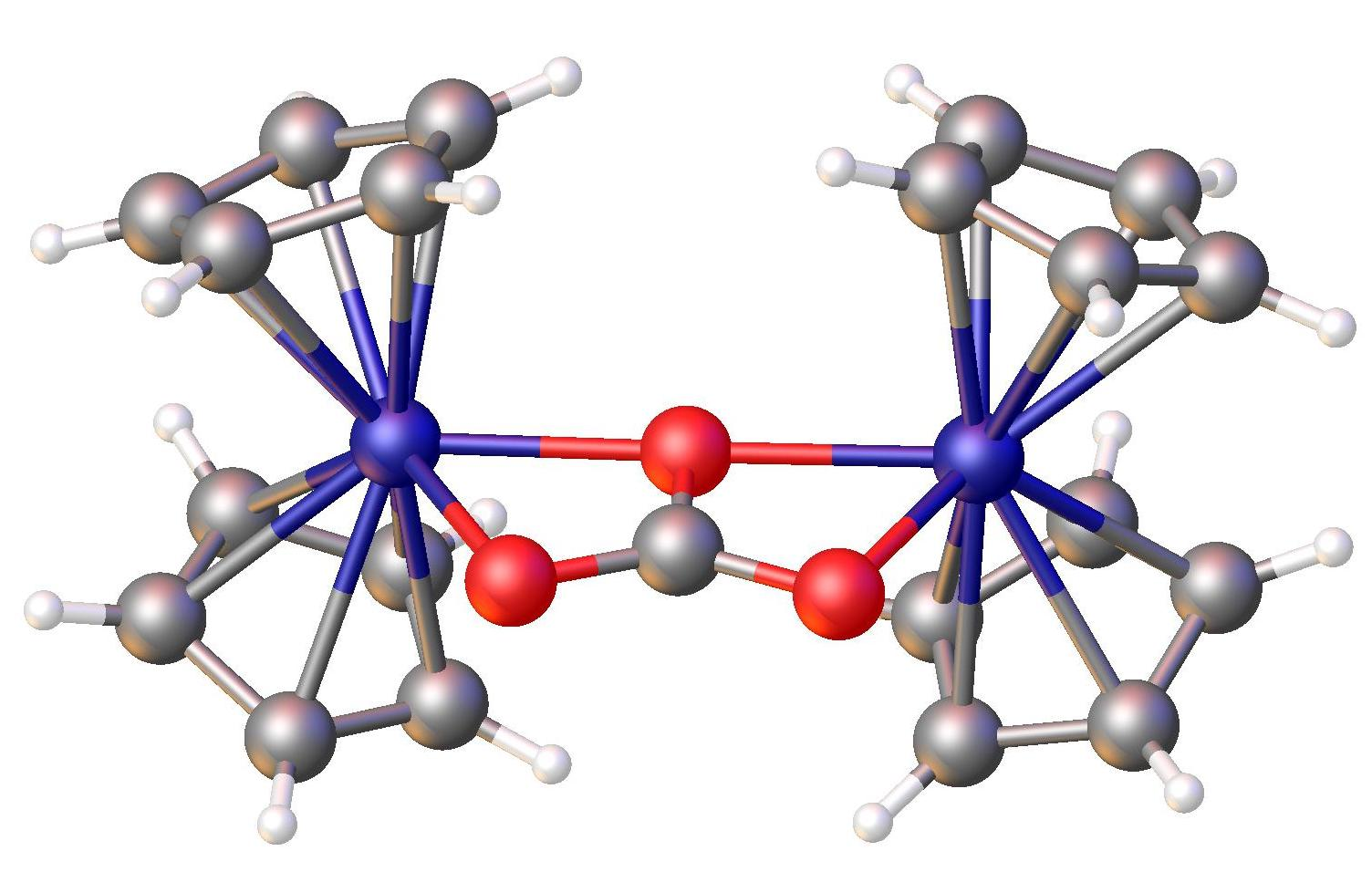
Structure for (Cp_{2}Ti)_{2}CO_{3}.

Structure of [Ru_{2}(CO_{3})_{4}Cl_{2}]^{5−}.

Carbonate is a pseudohalide ligand. With a saturated pi-system, it has no pi-acceptor properties. As indicated by the pK_{a} values for carbonic acid: pK_{1} = 6.35 and pK_{2} = 10.33, carbonate and bicarbonate are not strongly basic.

To a single metal ion, carbonate is observed to bind in both unidentate (κ^{1}-) and bidentate (κ^{2}-) fashions. In the covalent bond classification method, κ^{1}-carbonate is an X ligand and κ^{2}-carbonate is an X_{2} ligand. With two metals, the number of bonding modes increases because carbonate often serves as a bridging ligand. It can span metal-metal bonds as in [Ru_{2}(CO_{3})_{4}Cl_{2}]^{5−}, where again it functions as an (X)_{2} ligand. More commonly, all three oxygen centers bind, as illustrated by [(C_{5}H_{5})_{2}Ti]_{2}CO_{3}. In such cases, carbonate is an L-X ligand, providing 3 electrons to each metal. More complicated motifs have been characterized by X-ray crystallography including [(VO)_{6}(μ-OH)_{9}(CO_{3})_{4}]^{5−}.

=== Bicarbonate ===
Bonding modes for bicarbonate ligands.

The bonding modes of bicarbonate are more limited than those for carbonate, in part because it is less basic and in part because the proton occupies a metal-binding site. Typically bicarbonate is assumed to bind as an unidentate X ligand. Structural studies on such complexes are, however, rare.

== Synthesis ==
Carbonato complexes are prepared by salt metathesis reactions using alkali metal carbonate salts as precursors. In some cases, bicarbonate intermediates are implicated since carbonate does not exist in appreciable concentrations near neutral pH. The other chief route to metal carbonato complexes involves addition of CO_{2} to metal oxides. Such reactions may be catalyzed by water since the carbonation of metal hydroxides is particularly well established. Isotope labeling studies show that these reactions can proceed (and perhaps usually proceed) without scission of the M–OH bond (L = generic ligand):

[L_{n}M−^{17}OH]^{z} + CO_{2} → [L_{n}M−^{17}OCO_{2}H]^{z}

Many esoteric routes have been demonstrated. For example, the deoxygenation of peroxycarbonate by tertiary phosphines:

Pt(PPh_{3})_{2}(O_{3}CO) + PPh_{3} → Pt(PPh_{3})_{2}(O_{2}CO) + OPPh_{3} (Ph = C_{6}H_{5})

Carbon dioxide undergoes disproportionation upon reaction with low-valence metals.

== Reactions ==
Bicarbonate and carbonato complexes often can be interconverted. Such reactions are molecular versions of the familiar reaction of acids with mineral carbonates.

Protonation of carbonato complexes gives the corresponding bicarbonate complexes. Protonation occurs at the coordinated oxygen. This process is the microscopic reverse of the first step in the carbonation of metal hydroxides. Protonation of bicarbonate ligands results in the loss of carbon dioxide and formation of the metal hydroxide. Particularly well studied are the reactions of [Co(NH_{3})_{4}(CO_{3})]^{+} and its ethylenediamine analogue carbonatobis(ethylenediamine)cobalt(III).

== Homoleptic complexes ==
Few homoleptic carbonato complexes have been characterized. One is [Zr(CO_{3})_{4}]^{4−}, featuring 8-coordinate Zr(IV). Tris(carbonato)cobalt(III) ([Co(CO_{3})_{3}]^{3−}) is another example.

== Use and natural occurrence ==
While metal carbonato and bicarbonate complexes are of no direct commercial importance, their behavior is fundamental to mineralogy and biochemistry. Several minerals are metal carbonates, and a few feature molecular carbonate complexes, such as hellyerite ([Ni_{2}(CO_{3})_{2}(H_{2}O)_{8}]·H_{2}O).

In the biological sphere, zinc bicarbonate complexes are intermediates in the action of carbonic anhydrase. This reaction is often portrayed with zinc imidazole complexes:

[(imidazole)_{3}ZnOH]^{+} + CO_{2} ⇌ [(imidazole)_{3}ZnOCO_{2}H]^{+}
