= Tris(ethylenediamine)cobalt(III) chloride =

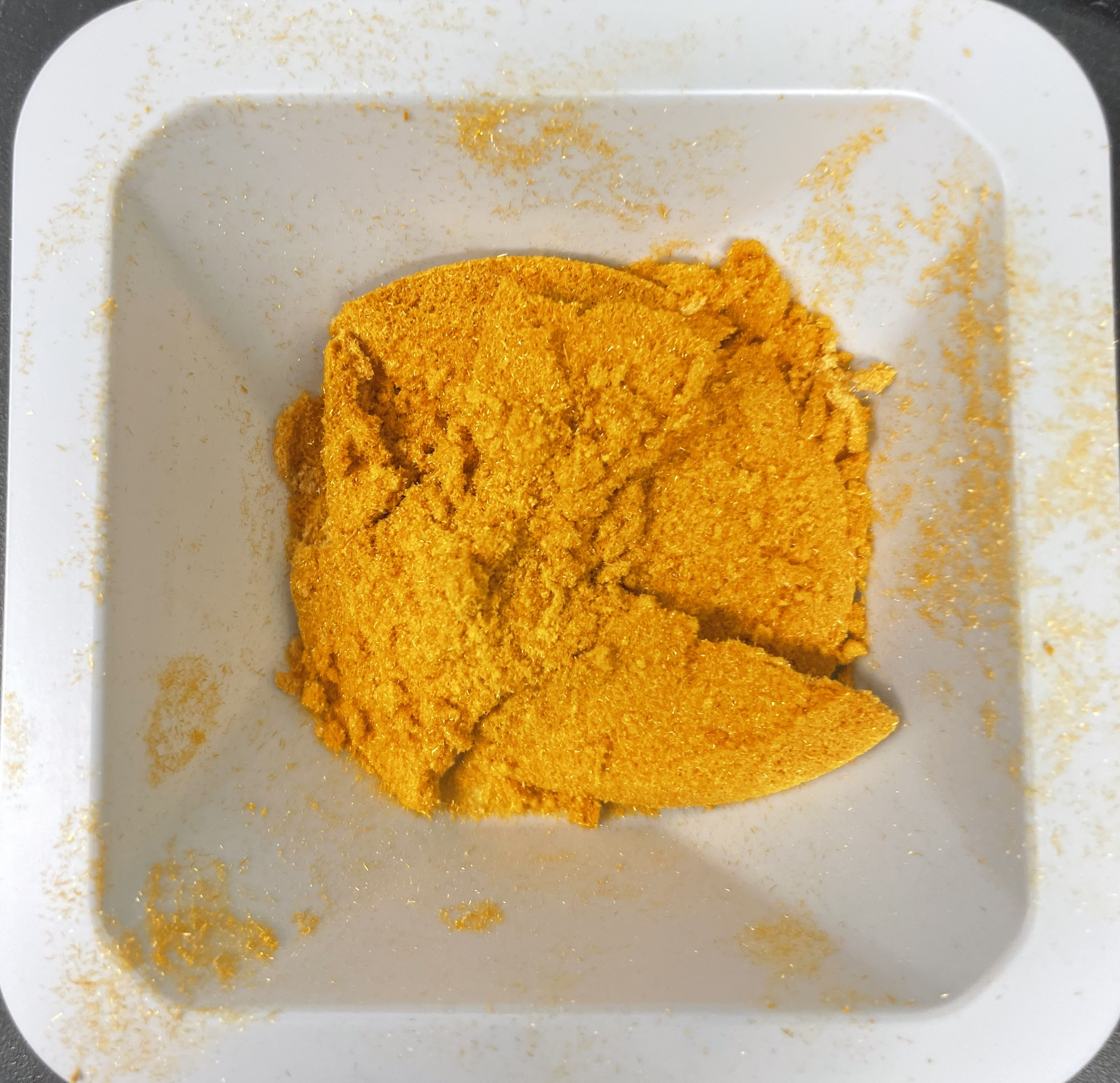

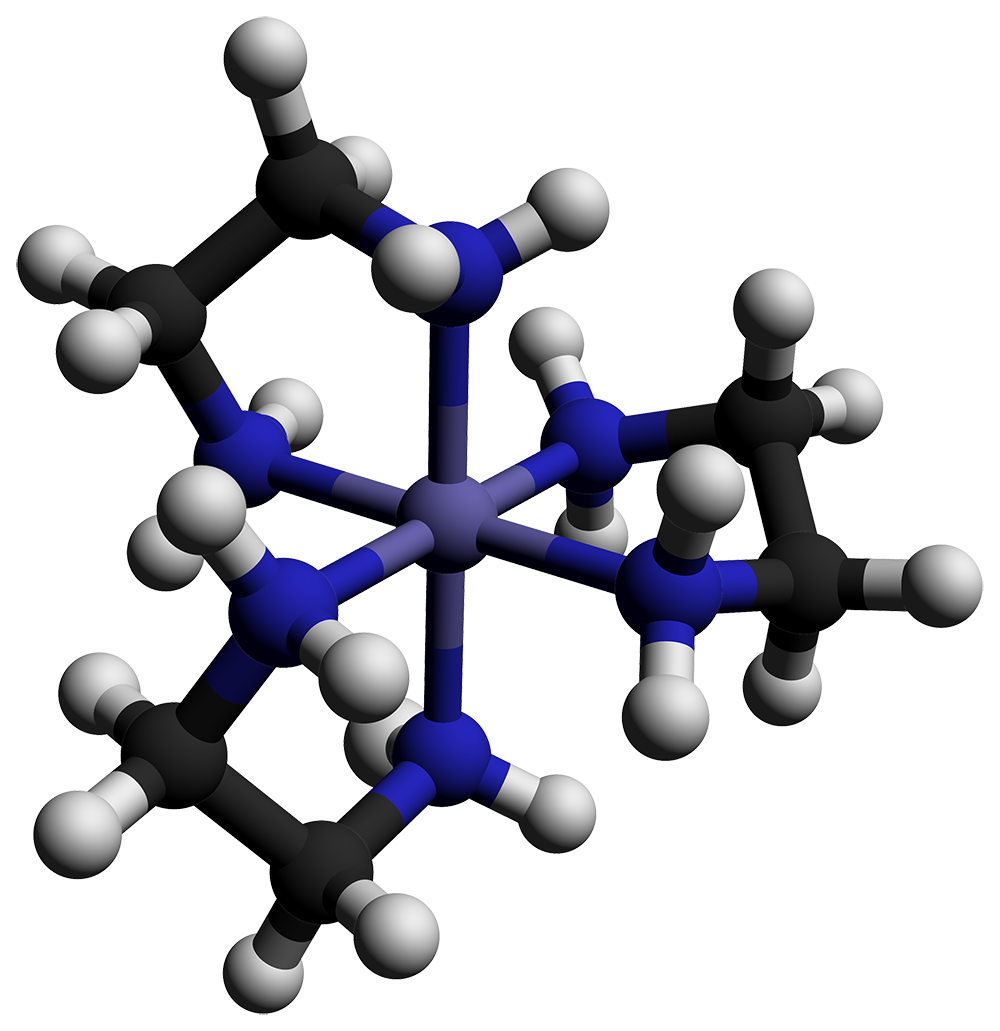

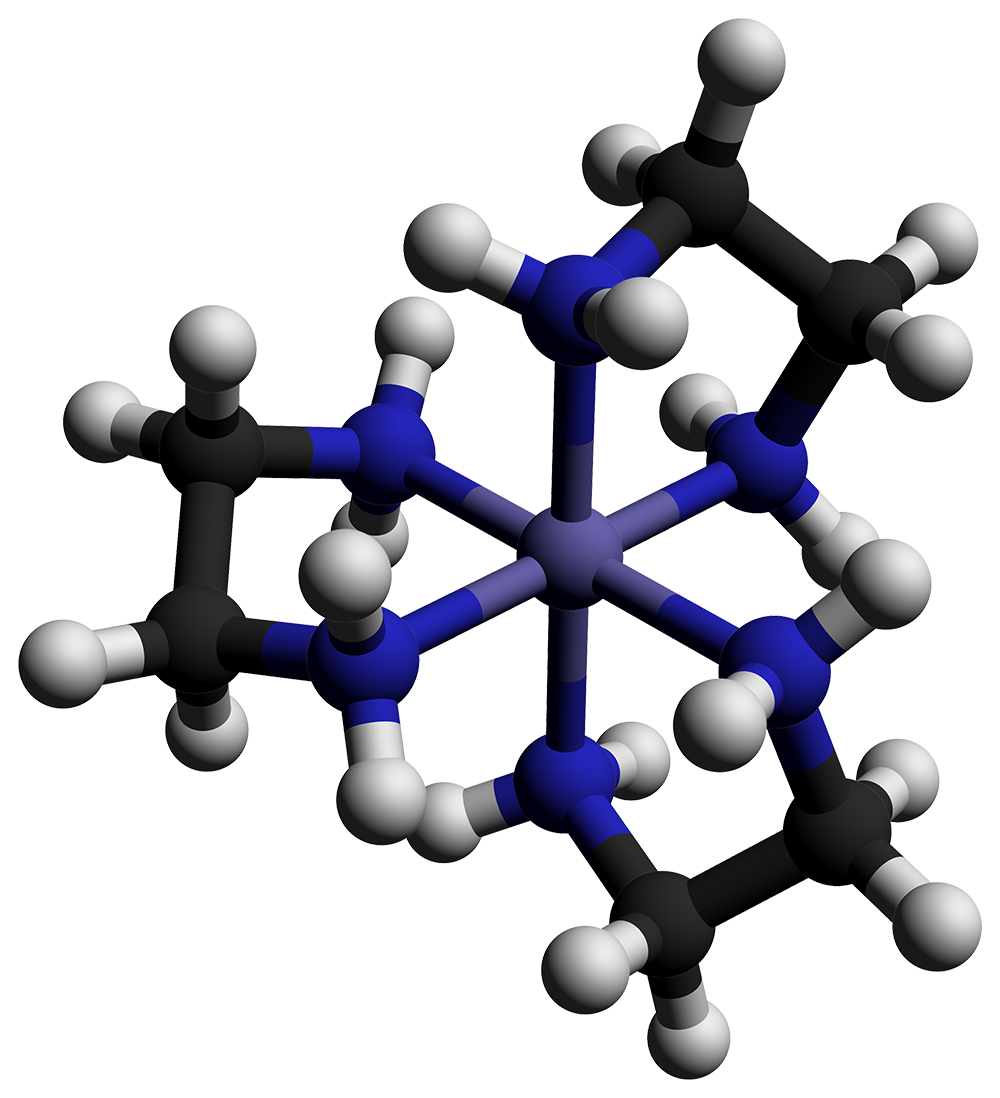

Names
- IUPAC name Tris(ethane-1,2-diamine)cobalt(III) chloride
- Other names Tris(ethylenediamine)cobalt(III) chloride

Identifiers
| CAS Number | 207802-43-5 |
| 3D model (JSmol) | Interactive image; dihydrate: Interactive image; trihydrate: Interactive image |
| ChemSpider | 147079 |
| PubChem CID | dihydrate: 71311392; trihydrate: 73995044 |
| CompTox Dashboard (EPA) | DTXSID10746548; dihydrate: DTXSID10746548 |
- InChI: InChI=1S/3C2H8N2.3ClH.Co/c3*3-1-2-4;;;;/h3*1-4H2;3*1H;/q;;;;;;+3/p-3 Key: NFUAZJFARNNNFB-UHFFFAOYSA-K; dihydrate: InChI=1S/3C2H8N2.3ClH.Co.2H2O/c3*3-1-2-4;;;;;;/h3*1-4H2;3*1H;;2*1H2/q;;;;;;+3;;/p-3 Key: ALLUKJGRPOLBEF-UHFFFAOYSA-K; trihydrate: InChI=1S/3C2H8N2.3ClH.Co.3H2O/c3*3-1-2-4;;;;;;;/h3*1-4H2;3*1H;;3*1H2/q;;;;;;+3;;;/p-3 Key: WBMVTRUQSMZIKW-UHFFFAOYSA-K
- SMILES: C(CN)N.C(CN)N.C(CN)N.[Cl-].[Cl-].[Cl-].[Co+3]; dihydrate: C(CN)N.C(CN)N.C(CN)N.O.O.Cl[Co](Cl)Cl; trihydrate: C(CN)N.C(CN)N.C(CN)N.O.O.O.[Cl-].[Cl-].[Cl-].[Co+3]

Properties
| Chemical formula | C_{6}H_{24}N_{6}Cl_{3}Co |
| Molar mass | 345.59 |
| Appearance | yellow-orange solid |
| Melting point | 275 °C (527 °F; 548 K) (decomposes) |
- Except where otherwise noted, data are given for materials in their standard state (at 25 °C [77 °F], 100 kPa). verify (what is ?) Infobox references

Tris(ethylenediamine)cobalt(III) chloride is an inorganic compound with the formula [Co(en)_{3}]Cl_{3} (where "en" is the abbreviation for ethylenediamine). It is the chloride salt of the coordination complex [Co(en)_{3}]^{3+}. This trication was important in the history of coordination chemistry because of its stability and its stereochemistry. Many different salts have been described. The complex was first described by Alfred Werner who isolated this salt as yellow-gold needle-like crystals.

== Synthesis and structure ==
The compound is prepared from an aqueous solution of ethylenediamine and virtually any cobalt(II) salt, such as cobalt(II) chloride. The solution is purged with air to oxidize the cobalt(II)-ethylenediamine complexes to cobalt(III). The reaction proceeds in 95% yield, and the trication can be isolated with a variety of anions. A detailed product analysis of a large-scale synthesis revealed that one minor by-product was [Co(en)_{2}Cl(H_{2}NCH_{2}CH_{2}NH_{3})]Cl_{3}, which contains a rare monodentate ethylenediamine ligand (protonated).

The cation [Co(en)_{3}]^{3+} is octahedral with Co-N distances in the range 1.947–1.981 Å. The N-Co-N angles are 85° within the chelate rings and 90° between nitrogen atoms on adjacent rings.

== Stereochemistry ==
Structure of the Δ-(lel)_{3} (or Δ-(λλλ)) isomer of [Co(en)_{3}]^{3+}. One of the three C_{2} symmetry axes is shown in red.

The point group of this complex is D_{3}. The complex can be resolved into enantiomers that are described as Δ and Λ. Usually the resolution entails use of tartrate salts. The optical resolution is a standard component of inorganic synthesis courses. Because of its nonplanarity, the MN_{2}C_{2} rings can adopt either of two conformations, which are described by the symbols λ and δ. The registry between these ring conformations and the absolute configuration of the metal centers is described by the nomenclature lel (when the en backbone lies parallel with the C_{3} symmetry axis) or ob (when the en backbone is obverse to this same C_{3} axis). Thus, the following diastereomeric conformations can be identified: Δ-(lel)_{3}, Δ-(lel)_{2}(ob), Δ-(lel)(ob)_{2}, and Δ-(ob)_{3}. The mirror images of these species of course exist also.

== Hydrates ==
Cationic coordination complexes of ammonia and alkyl amines typically crystallize with water in the lattice, and the stoichiometry can depend on the conditions of crystallization and, in the cases of chiral complexes, the optical purity of the cation. Racemic [Co(en)_{3}]Cl_{3} is most often obtained as the di- or trihydrate. For the optically pure salt (+)-[Co(en)_{3}]Cl_{3}·1.5H_{2}O, (+)-[Co(en)_{3}]Cl_{3}·0.5NaCl·3H_{2}O, and (+)-[Co(en)_{3}]Cl_{3}·H_{2}O are also known.

== Related compounds ==
- Tris(ethylenediamine)chromium(III) chloride.
