= Sodium tris(carbonato)cobalt(III) =

Identifiers
CAS Number	23311-39-9 (anhydrous); 15684-40-9 (trihydrate)
3D model (JSmol)	Interactive image
ChemSpider	9100093 anhydrous
PubChem CID	10924848 anhydrous
- InChI: InChI=1S/3CH2O3.Co.3Na.3H2O/c3*2-1(3)4;;;;;;;/h3*(H2,2,3,4);;;;;3*1H2/q;;;+3;3*+1;;;/p-6 Key: RAXRATBBPMSPAF-UHFFFAOYSA-H
- SMILES: C(=O)([O-])[O-].C(=O)([O-])[O-].C(=O)([O-])[O-].[Na+].[Na+].[Na+].[Co+3].O.O.O

Properties
Chemical formula	C_{3}H_{6}CoNa_{3}O_{12}
Molar mass	361.972 g·mol^{−1}
Appearance	green solid
- Except where otherwise noted, data are given for materials in their standard state (at 25 °C [77 °F], 100 kPa). Infobox references

Sodium tris(carbonato)cobaltate(III) is the inorganic compound with the formula Na_{3}Co(CO_{3})_{3}•3H_{2}O. The salt contains an olive-green metastable cobalt(III) coordination complex. The salt, a homoleptic metal carbonato complex, is sometimes referred to as the “Field-Durrant precursor” and is prepared by the “Field-Durrant synthesis”. It is used in the synthesis of other cobalt(III) complexes. Otherwise cobalt(III) complexes are generated from cobalt(II) precursors, a process that requires an oxidant.

== Synthesis ==
An aqueous solution of cobalt(II) nitrate and hydrogen peroxide is added to a solution of sodium bicarbonate, leading to precipitation of the olive solid. The reaction also generates lots of oxygen due to the decomposition of hydrogen peroxide. The method is a modification of the synthesis of what has been described as “Co_{2}(CO_{3})_{3}”.

== Structure and synthetic applications ==
The identity of this complex anion has been established by X-ray crystallography of [Co(NH_{3})_{6}][Co(κ^{2}-CO_{3})_{3}], which is also olive-green. This salt is prepared by the addition of [Co(NH_{3})_{6}]Cl_{3} to fresh solutions of sodium tris(carbonato)cobaltate(III). It is anhydrous. The anionic complex features three bidentate (κ^{2}-) carbonate ligands. The structure of Na_{3}Co(CO_{3})_{3} or its hydrates, while probably featuring the same anion, is not absolutely certain. Thermal gravimetric analysis favors the presence of one aquo ligand, and infra-red spectroscopy indicates the presence of both bi- and unidentate carbonate ligands.

To some extent, the exact description of the title salt is unimportant since it is mainly used as a synthetic intermediate. Products include [Co(H_{2}O)_{6}]^{3+}, [Co(κ^{2}-CO_{3})(H_{2}O)_{4}]^{+}, and [Co(κ^{2}-CO_{3})_{2}(H_{2}O)_{2}]^{−} and their derivatives where the aquo ligand has been displaced. The closely related potassium tris(carbonato)cobaltate(III) has also been used for the preparation of diverse complexes. These derivatives include [Co(NH_{3})_{2}(κ^{2}-CO_{3})_{2}]^{−} and [Co(CN)_{2}(κ^{2}-CO_{3})_{2}]^{3-}, rare examples of bis(carbonato) cobaltate(III) complexes. Other derivatives include the dinitrite [Co(NH_{3})_{2}(κ^{2}-CO_{3})(NO_{2})_{2}]^{−} and the oxalate [Co(NH_{3})_{2}(κ^{2}-CO_{3})(C_{2}O_{4})]^{−}.

== Other literature ==
- Bauer, H. F.; Drinkard, W. C. (1960). "A General Synthesis of Cobalt(III) Complexes; A New Intermediate, Na_{3}[Co(CO_{3})_{3}]·3H_{2}O". Journal of the American Chemical Society. 82 (19): 5031–5032. doi:10.1021/ja01504a004.
- Fikru Tafesse, Elias Aphane, and Elizabeth Mongadi (2009): "Determination of the structural formula of sodium tris-carbonatocobaltate(III), Na3[Co(CO3)3]·3H2O by thermogravimetry". Journal of Thermal Analysis and Calorimetry, volume 102, issue 1, pages 91–97. doi:10.1007/s10973-009-0606-2
- Thomas P. McCutcheon and William J. Schuele (1953): "Complex Acids of Cobalt and Chromium. The Green Carbonatocobalt(III) Anion". Journal of the American Chemical Society, volume 75, issue 8, pages 1845–1846. doi:10.1021/ja01104a019
