= Calconcarboxylic acid =

Chemical compound

- Calconcarboxylic acid 2D structure

Names
- IUPAC name 3-hydroxy-4-[(2-hydroxy-4-sulfonaphthalen-1-yl)diazenyl]naphthalene-2-carboxylic acid
- Other names: Patton-Reeder Indicator; Calconcarbonic acid; Patton and Reeder's Indicator; Calconcarbonsaure; Calcon 3-carboxylic acid; 2-Hydroxy-1-(2-hydroxy-4-sulfo-1-naphthylazo)-3-naphthoic acid

Identifiers
CAS Number	3737-95-9
3D model (JSmol)	Interactive image
ChEMBL	ChEMBLCHEMBL331220
ChemSpider	4516362
ECHA InfoCard	100.021.016
MeSH	acid 1-(2-hydroxy-4-sulfo-1-naphthylazo)-2-hydroxy-3-naphthoic acid
PubChem CID	77330
UNII	QY572ZC8VG
CompTox Dashboard (EPA)	DTXSID5063156
- InChI: InChI=1S/C21H14N2O7S/c24-16-10-17(31(28,29)30)13-7-3-4-8-14(13)18(16)22-23-19-12-6-2-1-5-11(12)9-15(20(19)25)21(26)27/h1-10,24-25H,(H,26,27)(H,28,29,30) Key: MVQBFZXBLLMXGS-UHFFFAOYSA-N
- SMILES: C1=CC=C2C(=C1)C=C(C(=C2N=NC3=C(C=C(C4=CC=CC=C43)S(=O)(=O)O)O)O)C(=O)O

Properties
Chemical formula	C_{21}H_{14}N_{2}O_{7}S
Molar mass	438.41
Density	1.6±0.1 g/cm^{3}
Melting point	300°C (decomposition)
Solubility	Soluble in water, ethanol, sodium hydroxide, ethanol

Hazards
- Occupational safety and health (OHS/OSH)
Main hazards	Irritant
- GHS labelling
Pictograms	(GHS07: Exclamation mark)
Signal word	Warning
Hazard statements	H315, H319, H335
Precautionary statements	P261, P264, P271, P280, P302+P352, P304+P340, P305+P351+P338, P312, P321, P332+P313, P337+P313, P362, P403+P233, P405, P501
Safety data sheet (SDS)	External LCSS

Related compounds
Related complexometric indicators	Calcein, Curcumin, Eriochrome Black T, Fast Sulphon Black, Xylenol orange
- Except where otherwise noted, data are given for materials in their standard state (at 25 °C [77 °F], 100 kPa). Infobox references

Calconcarboxylic acid (IUPAC name 3-hydroxy-4-[(2-hydroxy-4-sulfonaphthalen-1-yl)diazenyl]naphthalene-2-carboxylic acid; commonly called Patton and Reeder's Indicator) is an azo dye that is used as an indicator for complexometric titrations of calcium with ethylenediaminetetraacetic acid (EDTA) in the presence of magnesium. Structurally, it is similar to eriochrome blue black R, which is obtained from calconcarboxylic acid by decarboxylation and reaction with sodium hydroxide.

== Properties ==
Calconcarboxlic acid is soluble in water and a variety of other solvents, including sodium hydroxide, ethanol and methanol. It has a violet colour in dissolved form in ethanol. The melting point of calconcarboxylic acid is at approximately 300 °C, where it undergoes thermal decomposition.

== Background ==
Though the determination of calcium and magnesium by complexometric titration with standard solutions of disodium dihydrogen tetraacetate, utilising Eriochrome Black T as indicator is widely accepted and quite adequately understood, it, like other complexometric titration methods, suffers from the limitations of having an indistinct endpoint (where a photometric titrator is needed to provide acceptable accuracy) and/or having to separate the metals before titration can occur. Calconcarboxylic acid was thus adopted as a superior alternative due to its ability to give a good and visual endpoint and its rapid performance even with the presence of magnesium.

== Synthesis ==
As described by James Patton and Wendell Reeder in 1956, calconcarboxylic acid can be synthesised by coupling diazotized 1-amino-2-naphthol-4-sulfonic acid with 2-hydroxy-3-napthoic acid.

== Applications ==
Calconcarboxylic acid is used for the determination of calcium ion concentration by complexometric titration. Free calconcarboxylic acid is blue colour, but changes to pink/red when it forms a complex with calcium ions. EDTA forms a more stable complex with calcium than calconcarboxylic acid does, so addition of EDTA to the Ca–calconcarboxylic acid complex causes formation of Ca-EDTA instead, leading to reversion to the blue colour of free calconcarboxylic acid.

For the complexometric titration, the indicator is first added to the titrant containing the calcium ions to form the calcium ion-indicator complex (Ca-PR) with a pink/red colour. This is then titrated against a standard solution of EDTA. The endpoint can be observed when the indicator produces a sharp, stable colour change from wine red to pure blue, which occurs at pH values between 12 and 14, this indicates the endpoint of the titration, as the Ca-PR complexes have been completely replaced by the Ca-EDTA complexes and hence the PR indicator reverts to its blue colour.

The reaction can be given by:

Ca-PR + EDTA^{4-} → PR + [Ca-EDTA]^{2-}

The Patton-Reeder Indicator is often used here in the form of a triturate.

This method of complexometric titration is dependent on the pH of the solution being sufficiently high to ensure that magnesium ions precipitate as magnesium hydroxide before the PR indicator is added to prevent interference with the results, as if magnesium were present, the EDTA would also form complexes with it. Concentrated sodium hydroxide or potassium hydroxide is usually added to the solution to this end.

The accuracy of this method may also be affected by the presence of metal ions such as copper, iron, cobalt, zinc or manganese in sufficiently high concentrations.
