= Acid Red 29 =

Names
- Other names: Chromotrope 2R; Disodium 4,5-dihydroxy-3-phenylazonaphthalene-2,7-disulphonate

Identifiers
CAS Number	4197-07-3
3D model (JSmol)	Interactive image
ChEBI	CHEBI:87106
ChemSpider	21172023
ECHA InfoCard	100.021.896
EC Number	224-085-0
PubChem CID	20172
CompTox Dashboard (EPA)	DTXSID60425518
- InChI: InChI=1S/C16H12N2O8S2.2Na/c19-12-8-11(27(21,22)23)6-9-7-13(28(24,25)26)15(16(20)14(9)12)18-17-10-4-2-1-3-5-10;;/h1-8,19-20H,(H,21,22,23)(H,24,25,26);;/q;2*+1/p-2 Key: GXEAXHYQKZAJGB-UHFFFAOYSA-L
- SMILES: C1=CC=C(C=C1)N=NC2=C(C3=C(C=C(C=C3C=C2S(=O)(=O)[O-])S(=O)(=O)[O-])O)O.[Na+].[Na+]

Properties
Chemical formula	C_{16}H_{10}N_{2}Na_{2}O_{8}S_{2}
Molar mass	468.36 g·mol^{−1}

Hazards
- GHS labelling
Pictograms	(GHS07: Exclamation mark)
Signal word	Warning
Hazard statements	H315, H319, H335
Precautionary statements	P261, P264, P264+P265, P271, P280, P302+P352, P304+P340, P305+P351+P338, P319, P321, P332+P317, P337+P317, P362+P364, P403+P233, P405, P501
- Except where otherwise noted, data are given for materials in their standard state (at 25 °C [77 °F], 100 kPa). Infobox references

Color Index Acid Red 29 is a chemical compound belonging to the class of azo dyes and the application group of acid dyes. It is the simplest chromotropic dye and was originally used to dye wool.

== Synthesis ==
Acid Red 29 is synthesized via the diazotization of aniline using sodium nitrite and hydrochloric acid, followed by the azo coupling of the resulting diazonium salt with chromotropic acid.

== Use ==
Acid Red 29 is used to dye wool a bluish-red hue. Treatment with chromium salts, such as potassium dichromate, produces a distinct color change from red to violet.

Acid Red 29 is used in histological staining—such as the Gömöri trichrome stain—in combination with aniline blue and hematoxylin.

Acid Red 29 is used in the complexometric titration of thorium.

== History ==
The production of this dye was patented by Hoechst in 1890.

As with other chromotropic acid-based dyes, the patent literature describes its primary application as wool printing.
