= Chromism =

Color change of a chemical substance due to its environment

In chemistry, chromism is a process that induces a change, often reversible, in the colors of compounds. In most cases, chromism is based on a change in the electron states of molecules, especially the π- or d-electron state, so this phenomenon is induced by various external stimuli which can alter the electron density of substances. It is known that there are many natural compounds that have chromism, and many artificial compounds with specific chromism have been synthesized to date. It is usually synonymous with chromotropism, the (reversible) change in color of a substance due to the physical and chemical properties of its ambient surrounding medium, such as temperature and pressure, light, solvent, and presence of ions and electrons.

Chromism is classified by what kind of stimuli are used. Examples of the major kinds of chromism are as follows.

- thermochromism is chromism that is induced by heat, that is, a change of temperature. This is the most common chromism of all.
- photochromism is induced by light irradiation. This phenomenon is based on the isomerization between two different molecular structures, light-induced formation of color centers in crystals, precipitation of metal particles in a glass, or other mechanisms.
- electrochromism is induced by the gain and loss of electrons. This phenomenon occurs in compounds with redox active sites, such as metal ions or organic radicals.
- solvatochromism depends on the polarity of the solvent. Most solvatochromic compounds are metal complexes.

There are many more chromisms and these are listed below in § Color change phenomena.

The output from the chromisms described above is observed by a change in the absorption spectra of the chromic material. An increasingly important group of chromisms are those where changes are displayed in their emission spectra. Hence they are called fluorochromisms, exemplified by solvatofluorochromism, electrofluorochromism and mechanofluorochromism.

== Chromic phenomena ==
Chromic phenomena are those phenomena in which color is produced when light interacts with materials, often called chromic materials in a variety of ways. These can be categorized under the following five headings:

- Stimulated (reversible) color change
- The absorption and reflection of light
- The absorption of energy followed by the emission of light
- The absorption of light and energy transfer (or conversion)
- The manipulation of light.

== Color change phenomena ==
Those phenomena which involve the change in color of a chemical compound under an external stimulus fall under the generic term of chromisms. They take their individual names from the type of the external influence, which can be either chemical or physical, that is involved. Many of these phenomena are reversible. The following list includes all the classic chromisms plus many others of increasing interest in newer outlets.

Type	Cause
Thermochromism	temperature
Electrochromism	electric current
Gasochromism	gas - hydrogen/oxygen redox
Solvatochromism	solvent polarity
Concentratochromism	changes in the concentration in the medium
Rigidichromism	changes in the rigidity of the medium
Vapochromism	vapour of an organic compound due to chemical polarity/polarisation
Ionochromism	ions
Halochromism	change in pH
Metallochromism	metal ions
Mechanochromism	mechanical actions
Tribochromism	mechanical friction
Piezochromism	mechanical pressure
Cathodochromism	electron beam irradiation
Radiochromism	ionising radiation
Magnetochromism	magnetic field
Biochromism	interfacing with a biological entity
Amorphochromism	changes in crystalline habitat
Cryochromism	lowering of temperature
Hydrochromism	interaction with bulk water or humidity
Chronochromism	indirectly as a result of the passage of time
Aggregachromism	dimerisation/aggregation of chromophores
Crystallochromism	changes in crystal structure of a chromophore
Sorptiochromism	when a species is surface adsorbed

There are also chromisms which involve two or more stimuli. Examples include:

- Photoelectrochromism – Photovoltachromism – Bioelectrochromism – Solvatophotochromism – Thermosolvatochromism – Halosolvatochromism – Electromechanochromism.

Color changes are also observed on the interaction of metallic nanoparticles and their attached ligands with another stimulus. Examples include plasmonic solvatochromism, plasmonic ionochromism, plasmonic chronochromism and plasmonic vapochromism.

== Commercial applications ==
Color change materials have been used in several very common outlets but also in an increasing number of new ones. Commercial applications include photochromics in ophthalmics, fashion/cosmetics, security, sensors, optical memory and optical switches, thermochromics in paints, inks, plastics and textiles as indicators/sensors and in architecture, ionochromics in copy paper, direct thermal printing and textile sensors, electrochromics in car mirrors, smart windows, flexible devices and solar protection, solvatochromics in biological probes and sensors, gasochromics in windows and gas sensors.

== Dyes and pigments ==
Classical dyes and pigments produce color by the absorption and reflection of light; these are the materials that make a major impact on the color of our daily lives. In 2000, world production of organic dyes was 800,000 tonnes and of organic pigments, 250,000 tonnes and the volume has grown at a steady rate throughout the early years of this century. In 2019 the value of the organic dyes/pigments market is forecast to be $19.5bn. Their value is exceeded by the very large production of inorganic pigments. Organic dyes are used mainly to color textile fibers, paper, hair, leather, while pigments are used largely in inks, paints, plastic and cosmetics. Both are used in the growth area of the digital printing of textiles, paper and other surfaces.

Dyes are also made using the properties of chromic substances: Examples being Photochromic dyes and Thermochromic dyes

== Luminescence ==
The absorption of energy followed by the emission of light is often described by the term luminescence. The exact term used is based on the energy source responsible for the luminescence as in color-change phenomena.

- Electrical – electroluminescence Galvanoluminescence Sonoluminescence.
- Photons (light) – Photoluminescence Fluorescence Phosphorescence Biofluorescence.
- Chemical – Chemiluminescence Bioluminescence Electrochemiluminescence.
- Thermal – Thermoluminescence Pyroluminescence Candololuminescence.
- Electron Beam – Cathodoluminescence Anodoluminescence Radioluminescence.
- Mechanical – Triboluminescence Fractoluminescence Mechanoluminescence Crystalloluminescence Lyoluminescence Elasticoluminescence.

Many of these phenomena are widely used in consumer products and other important outlets. Cathodoluminescence is used in cathode-ray tubes, photoluminescence in fluorescent lighting and plasma display panels, phosphorescence in safety signs and low energy lighting, fluorescence in pigments, inks, optical brighteners, safety clothing, and biological and medicinal analysis and diagnostics, chemoluminescence and bioluminescence in analysis, diagnostics and sensors, and electroluminescence in the burgeoning areas of light-emitting diodes (LEDs/OLEDs), displays and panel lighting. Important new developments are taking place in the areas of quantum dots and metallic nanoparticles.

== Light and energy transfer ==
Absorption of light and energy transfer (or conversion) involves colored molecules that can transfer electromagnetic energy, commonly in the form of a laser light source, to other molecules in another form of energy, such as thermal or electrical. These laser addressable colorants, also called near-infrared absorbers, are used in thermal energy conversion, photosensitisation of chemical reactions and the selective absorption of light. Applications areas include optical data storage, as organic photoconductors, as sensitisers in photomedicine, such as photodynamic therapy and photothermal therapy in the treatment of cancer, in photodiagnosis and phototheranostics, and in the photoinactivation of microbes, blood and insects. The absorption of natural sunlight by chromic materials/chromophores is exploited in solar cells for the production of electrical energy via solar cells, using both inorganic photovoltaics and organic materials (organic photovoltaics) and dye sensitized solar cells (DSSCs), and also in the production of useful chemicals via artificial photosynthesis. A developing area is the conversion of light into kinetic energy, often described under the generic term of lightdriven molecular machines.

== Light manipulation ==
Materials may be used to control and manipulate light via a variety of mechanisms to produce useful effects involving color. For instance, a change of orientation of molecules to produce a visual effect as in liquid crystal displays. Other materials operate by producing a physical effect, by interference and diffraction as in lustre pigments and optically variable pigments, colloidal photonic crystals and in holography. Increasingly inspiration is coming from Nature, in the form of bioinspired structural colors. Molecular materials are also used to increase the intensity of light by modifying its movement through the materials by electrical means, so increasing its intensity as in organic lasers, or in modifying the transmission of light through materials, as in opto-electronics, or by purely by all optical means as in optical limiters.

== Bibliography ==
- Bamfield Peter and Hutchings Michael, Chromic Phenomena; technological applications of colour chemistry, 3rd Edition, Royal Society of Chemistry, Cambridge, 2018. ISBN 978-1-78262-815-6 {EPUB ISBN 978-1-78801-503-5}.
- Vik Michal and Periyasamy Aravin Prince, Chromic Materials; Fundamentals, Measurements and Applications, Apple Academic Press, 2018. ISBN 9781771886802.
- Ferrara Mariella and Murat Bengisu, Materials that Change Color: Smart Materials and Intelligent Design, Springer, 2014. ISBN 978-3-319-00289-7
