= Acid Red 176 =

Names
- Other names: Chromotrope 2B; Chromotrope Red 4B; C.I. 16575; C.I. Acid Red 176; Disodium 4,5-dihydroxy-3-(p-nitrophenylazo)naphthalene-2,7-disulphonate; p-Nitrobenzeneazochromotropic acid sodium salt

Identifiers
CAS Number	548-80-1
3D model (JSmol)	Interactive image
ChemSpider	16735740
ECHA InfoCard	100.008.146
EC Number	208-959-9
PubChem CID	68360
UNII	81Y8BW5764
CompTox Dashboard (EPA)	DTXSID0060278
- InChI: InChI=1S/C16H11N3O10S2.2Na/c20-12-7-11(30(24,25)26)5-8-6-13(31(27,28)29)15(16(21)14(8)12)18-17-9-1-3-10(4-2-9)19(22)23;;/h1-7,20-21H,(H,24,25,26)(H,27,28,29);;/q;2*+1/p-2 Key: AXUUHWJXDWBCSG-UHFFFAOYSA-L
- SMILES: C1=CC(=CC=C1N=NC2=C(C3=C(C=C(C=C3C=C2S(=O)(=O)[O-])S(=O)(=O)[O-])O)O)[N+](=O)[O-].[Na+].[Na+]

Properties
Chemical formula	C_{16}H_{9}N_{3}Na_{2}O_{10}S_{2}
Molar mass	513.36 g·mol^{−1}

Hazards
- GHS labelling
Pictograms	(GHS07: Exclamation mark)
Signal word	Warning
Hazard statements	H315, H319, H335
Precautionary statements	P261, P264, P264+P265, P271, P280, P302+P352, P304+P340, P305+P351+P338, P319, P321, P332+P317, P337+P317, P362+P364, P403+P233, P405, P501
- Except where otherwise noted, data are given for materials in their standard state (at 25 °C [77 °F], 100 kPa). Infobox references

Color Index Acid Red 176 is a chemical compound belonging to the azo and acid dye families. It is a chromotropic dye originally used for dyeing wool.

== Synthesis ==
Acid Red 176 is synthesized via the diazotization of 4-nitroaniline using sodium nitrite and hydrochloric acid, followed by azo coupling of the resulting diazonium salt with chromotropic acid.

== Uses ==
Acid Red 176 is used to dye wool a bluish-red shade. Mordanting with chromium salts, such as potassium dichromate, induces a distinct color transition from red to blue or black.

Acid Red 176 serves as an indicator in the complexometric titration of thorium and in the photometric determination of magnesium in natural waters.

== History ==
The synthesis of the dye was patented by Hoechst in 1890. In common with other chromotropic acid-derived dyes described in these patents, its application in wool printing is highlighted.
