= Murexide test =

Chemical test to detect purine derivatives

The murexide test is an analytical technique to identify the presence of caffeine and other purine derivatives in a sample. These compounds do not respond to the common alkaloid identification tests such as Dragendorff's test. In this test, crude drugs (to be identified) are mixed with a tiny amount of potassium chlorate and a drop of hydrochloric acid. The sample is then evaporated to dryness and the resulting residue is exposed to ammonia vapour. Purine alkaloids produce a pinkish-purple color in this test due to formation of murexide (ammonium purpurate; appears purple in pure state), which the test is named after.

In pure form, murexide appears purple, but when it is produced by reaction of acidified solutions of purines and ammonia, various shades of purple and pink are produced.

== Uses ==
Murexide test is a color test for uric acid and some other purines. The (solid) sample is first treated with small volume of a concentrated acid such as hydrochloric acid, nitric acid, which is slowly evaporated away; subsequent addition of ammonia (NH_{3}) gives a purple color if uric acid was present, due to formation of murexide, or a yellow color that turns to red on heating if xanthine or its derivatives are present.
