= Dragendorff =

Dragendorff is a surname. Notable people with the surname include:

- Hans Dragendorff (1870–1941), German scholar
- Johann Georg Noel Dragendorff (1836–1898), German pharmacist and chemist
  - Dragendorff's reagent, used to detect alkaloids
