= Chromotropic dye =

Class of chemical compounds

Chromotropic dyes are a class of azo dyes formed by reacting various diazonium salts with chromotropic acid as a coupling component. The synthesis of chromotropic dyes was patented by Farbwerke vorm. Meister, Lucius & Brüning in Höchst a. M. (later Hoechst AG) in 1890. Originally, they were used primarily to dye wool. By adding various metal salts during the dyeing process—such as copper sulfate or potassium dichromate—these dyes can produce vibrant shades ranging from red to burgundy and violet to black. Due to this diversity and versatility in color tones, the dyes were named chromotropes.

Chromotropic dyes are also used in histological staining—such as in Gömöri trichrome staining—or as indicators in complexometric titrations.

Chromotrope
Name	Chromotrope 2R	Chromotrope 2B	Chromotrope 6B	Chromotrope 10B
Structural formula	Chromotrope 2R	Chromotrope 2B	Chromotrop 6B	Chromotrop 10B
Hue	red	blue-red	violet-red	red-violet
CAS Number	4197-07-3	548-80-1	4197-09-5	5850-63-5
PubChem	20172	68360	160740	135870601
Color Index	C.I. 16570	C.I. 16575	C.I. 16600	C.I. 16640
Color Index Name	Acid Red 29	Acid Red 176	Acid Violet 6	Acid Violet 13
Molecular Formula	C_{16}H_{10}N_{2}Na_{2}O_{8}S_{2}	C_{16}H_{9}N_{3}Na_{2}O_{10}S_{2}	C_{20}H_{16}N_{4}Na_{2}O_{9}S_{2}	C_{20}H_{12}N_{2}Na_{2}O_{8}S_{2}
Molar mass	468.37 g·mol^{−1}	513.37 g·mol^{−1}	566.47 g·mol^{−1}	518.43 g·mol^{−1}
