= Acid Violet 6 =

Names
- Other names: Chromotrope 6B; Disodium 3-[(4-acetamidophenyl)diazenyl]-4,5-dihydroxynaphthalene-2,7-disulfonate

Identifiers
CAS Number	4197-09-5
3D model (JSmol)	Interactive image
ChemSpider	20152404
ECHA InfoCard	100.109.228
EC Number	609-975-2
PubChem CID	160740
CompTox Dashboard (EPA)	DTXSID60889479
- InChI: InChI=1S/C18H15N3O9S2.2Na/c1-9(22)19-11-2-4-12(5-3-11)20-21-17-15(32(28,29)30)7-10-6-13(31(25,26)27)8-14(23)16(10)18(17)24;;/h2-8,23-24H,1H3,(H,19,22)(H,25,26,27)(H,28,29,30);;/q;2*+1/p-2 Key: BMCXYDZRKLKERB-UHFFFAOYSA-L
- SMILES: CC(=O)NC1=CC=C(C=C1)N=NC2=C(C3=C(C=C(C=C3C=C2S(=O)(=O)[O-])S(=O)(=O)[O-])O)O.[Na+].[Na+]

Properties
Chemical formula	C_{18}H_{13}N_{3}Na_{2}O_{9}S_{2}
Molar mass	525.41 g·mol^{−1}
- Except where otherwise noted, data are given for materials in their standard state (at 25 °C [77 °F], 100 kPa). Infobox references

Color Index Acid Violet 6 is a chemical compound belonging to the monoazo dyes group and the acid dyes class. It is a chromotropic dye used to dye wool violet-red.

== Synthesis ==
Acid Violet 6 is synthesized by the diazotization of 4-aminoacetanilide, followed by azo coupling of the resulting diazonium salt with chromotropic acid.

== History ==
The production of this dye was patented by Hoechst in 1890. In common with other chromotropic acid-based dyes described in the patent literature, its primary application is in wool printing.
