= Acid Violet 13 =

Names
- Other names: Chromotrope 10B; Disodium 4,5-dihydroxy-3-(naphthalen-1-yldiazenyl)naphthalene-2,7-disulfonate; Pontacyl Violet 6R

Identifiers
CAS Number	5850-63-5
3D model (JSmol)	Interactive image
ChEMBL	ChEMBL3961418
ChemSpider	24589963
ECHA InfoCard	100.112.959
PubChem CID	135870601
- InChI: InChI=1S/C20H14N2O8S2.2Na/c23-16-10-13(31(25,26)27)8-12-9-17(32(28,29)30)19(20(24)18(12)16)22-21-15-7-3-5-11-4-1-2-6-14(11)15;;/h1-10,23-24H,(H,25,26,27)(H,28,29,30);;/q;2*+1/p-2 Key: UKAUHDJTJXBRST-UHFFFAOYSA-L
- SMILES: C1=CC=C2C(=C1)C=CC=C2N=NC3=C(C4=C(C=C(C=C4C=C3S(=O)(=O)[O-])S(=O)(=O)[O-])O)O.[Na+].[Na+]

Properties
Chemical formula	C_{20}H_{12}N_{2}Na_{2}O_{8}S_{2}
Molar mass	518.42 g·mol^{−1}
- Except where otherwise noted, data are given for materials in their standard state (at 25 °C [77 °F], 100 kPa). Infobox references

Color Index Acid Violet 13 is a chemical compound belonging to the azo and acid dye classes. It is a chromotropic dye originally used for dyeing wool.

== Synthesis ==
Acid Violet 13 is synthesized via the diazotization of 1-aminonaphthalene using sodium nitrite and hydrochloric acid, followed by azo coupling of the resulting diazonium salt with chromotropic acid.

== Use ==
Acid Violet 13 is used to dye wool in a reddish-violet shade. The addition of chromium salts, such as potassium dichromate, during the dyeing process induces a distinct color shift from reddish-violet to blue-black.

== History ==
The production of the dye was patented by Hoechst in 1890. As with other chromotropic acid-based dyes described in the patents, its application in wool printing is particularly emphasized.
