= Chromic =

Chromic means of, relating to, or containing chromium.

- Chromic acid
- Chromic phenomenon
- Chromic anhydride
- Chromic oxide
- chromic chloride
