= Mechanochromism =

Change of color which occurs when chemicals are put under stress in mechanical processes

The change of colour which occurs when chemicals are put under stress in the solid state by mechanical grinding, crushing and milling; by friction and rubbing; or in the solid or solution state by high pressure or sonication is covered by the generic term mechanochromism. Specifically colour change under pressure is known as piezochromism and under grinding or attrition tribochromism.

== See also ==
- Chromism
- Photoelasticity (for the physical process)
