= C20H12N2Na2O7S2 =

The molecular formula C_{20}H_{12}N_{2}Na_{2}O_{7}S_{2} (molar mass: 502.42 g/mol, exact mass: 501.9881 u) may refer to:

- Acid_Red_13
- Azorubine
- Ponceau 6R
