= Ionochromism =

Ionochromism, similar to chromic methods such as photochromism, thermochromism and other chromism phenomena, is the reversible process of changing the color of a material by absorption or emission spectra of molecules using ions. Electrochromism is similar to ionochromism as it involves the use of electrons in order to change the color of materials. Both electrochromic and ionochromic materials undergo a change in color by the flow of charged particles, where electrochromic materials only involve an anionic species or negatively charged species such as electrons. An example of an ionochromic dye is a complexometric indicator. A complexometric indicator involves the presence of metal ions in order to facilitate color change and is often used in complexometric titration.

== Overview ==
Ionochromism is the process of reacting an ionochromic material with a charged species, or a positively or negatively charged ion. Materials that have ionochromic properties exhibit reversible color change, where the absence of a stimulus such as an ionic species can result in the compound changing to its original color. Various ionic color changing mechanisms that are used in chromic processes can be used in ionochromism, including:

1. Halochromism
2. Acidochromism
3. Metallochromism

== Molecules with ionochromic properties ==
Ionochromic materials exist in a wide range of molecules, including organic molecules, pH-sensitive dyes and indicators, and other color-changing compounds with chromophores. Some of these molecules include phthalides, fluorans, and leucotriarylmethanes.

=== Ionochromic materials ===
Compounds used in ionochromism
Compound name	pH range	Color change
Phenolphthalein	8.5-9.0	Colorless-red
Cresolphthalein	8.2-9.8	Colorless-red
Thymolphthalein	9.3-10.5	Colorless-blue
Phenol Red	6.8-8.4	Yellow-red
Cresol Red	7.2-8.8	Yellow-red
Thymol Blue	1.2-2.8	Red-yellow
Methyl Orange	3.1 4.4	Red Yellow
Methyl Red	4.4 6.2	Red Yellow
