= Complexometric indicator =

Chemical detector for metal ions in complexometric titrations

A complexometric indicator is an ionochromic dye that undergoes a definite color change in presence of specific metal ions. It forms a weak complex with ions in solution, resulting in a color significantly different from the free form. Complexometric indicators are also referred to as pM indicators.

== Complexometric titration ==
In analytical chemistry, complexometric indicators are used in complexometric titration to indicate the exact moment when all the metal ions in the solution are sequestered by a chelating agent (most usually EDTA). Such indicators are also called metallochromic indicators.

The indicator may be present in another liquid phase in equilibrium with the titrated phase, the indicator is described as extraction indicator.

Some complexometric indicators are sensitive to air and are destroyed. When such solution loses color during titration, a drop or two of fresh indicator may have to be added.

== Examples ==
Complexometric indicators are water-soluble organic molecules. Some examples are:

- Calcein with EDTA for calcium
- Patton-Reeder Indicator with EDTA for calcium with magnesium
- Curcumin for boron, that forms Rosocyanine, although the red color change of curcumin also occurs for pH > 8.4
- Eriochrome Black T for aluminium, cadmium, zinc, calcium and magnesium
- Fast Sulphon Black with EDTA for copper
- Hematoxylin for copper
- Murexide for calcium and rare earths, but also for copper, nickel, cobalt, and thorium
- Xylenol orange for gallium, indium and scandium

== Redox indicators ==
In some settings, when the titrated system is a redox system whose equilibrium is influenced by the removal of the metal ions, a redox indicator can function as a complexometric indicator.
