= Acid red 88 =

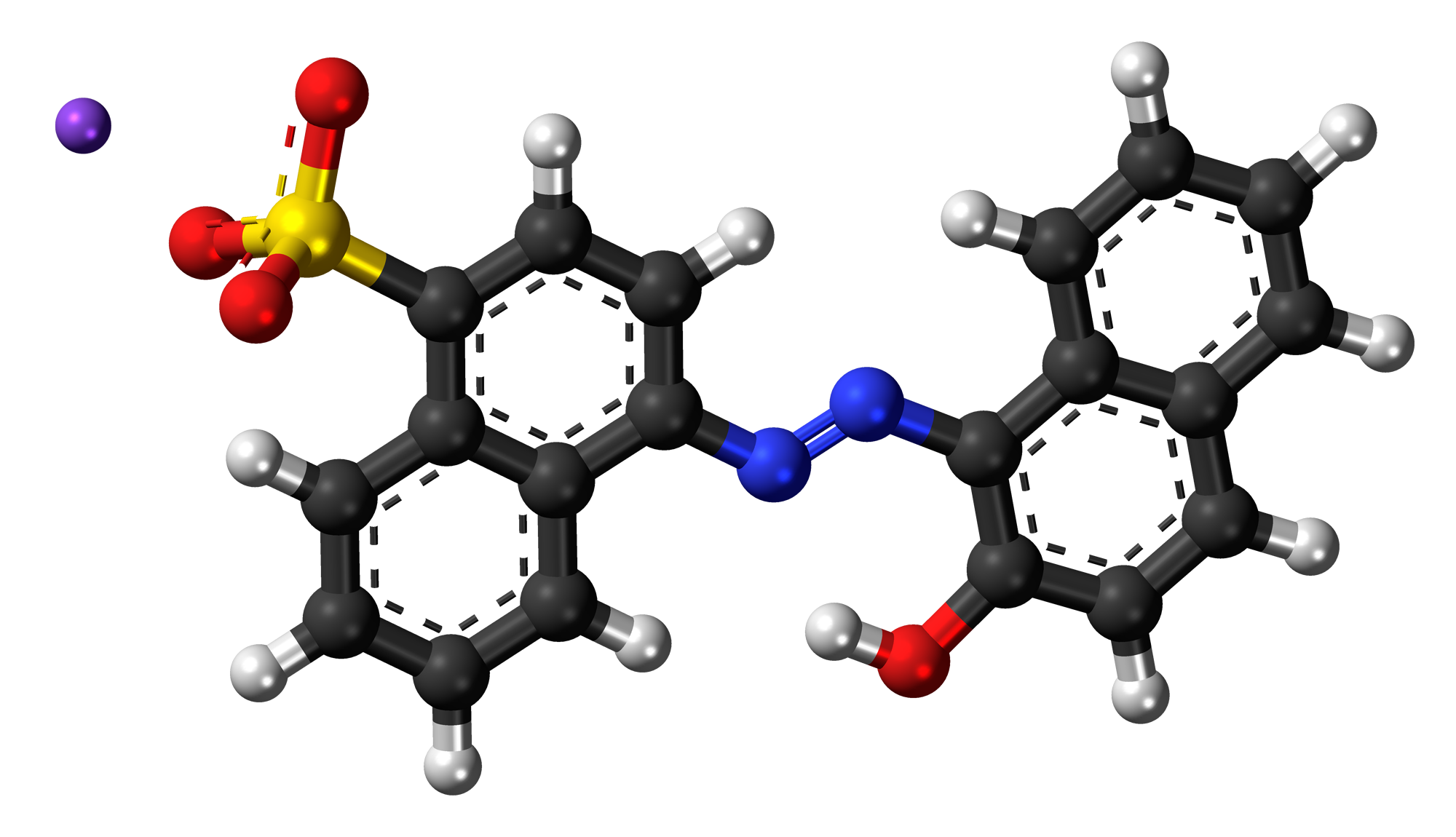

Names
- IUPAC name Sodium 4-(2-hydroxy-1-naphthalenylazo)-naphthalenesulfonate
- Other names Fast Red A 2-Naphthol Red; Roccelline; Solid Red A Toyo roccelline

Identifiers
| CAS Number | 1658-56-6 (E)-diazen |
| 3D model (JSmol) | Interactive image |
| ChemSpider | 23621588 |
| ECHA InfoCard | 100.015.238 |
| EC Number | 216-760-3 |
| MeSH | Fast+red+S |
| PubChem CID | 23722700; 23669381 (Z)-diazen; 23670762 (E)-diazen |
| RTECS number | QK2420000 |
| UNII | 7Z2135Z4K4 (E)-diazen |
| CompTox Dashboard (EPA) | DTXSID1041714 |
- InChI: InChI=1S/C20H14N2O4S.Na/c23-18-11-9-13-5-1-2-6-14(13)20(18)22-21-17-10-12-19(27(24,25)26)16-8-4-3-7-15(16)17;/h1-12,20H,(H,24,25,26);/q;+1/p-1 Key: IVEHGZAIVWEKHA-UHFFFAOYSA-N
- SMILES: [Na+].O=S(=O)([O-])c3ccc(N=Nc1c(O)ccc2ccccc12)c4ccccc34

Properties
| Chemical formula | C_{20}H_{13}N_{2}NaO_{4}S |
| Molar mass | 400.38 g·mol^{−1} |
| Appearance | Vivid, dark red, opaque, vitreous solid |
| Melting point | 280 °C (536 °F; 553 K) |
- Except where otherwise noted, data are given for materials in their standard state (at 25 °C [77 °F], 100 kPa). verify (what is ?) Infobox references

Acid red 88 is an azo dye. Due to its intense colour, solid samples appear almost black. It is used to dye cotton textiles red. A closely related acid dye is Acid Red 13.

== Preparation and use ==
It can be obtained by azo coupling of naphthionic acid and 2-naphthol. Instead of crystallising, it vitrifies when cooled or salted out of the solution.

This compound is used in the textile industry as a dye. It can also be used for research in photocatalysis (as degradation object).
