= Calmagite =

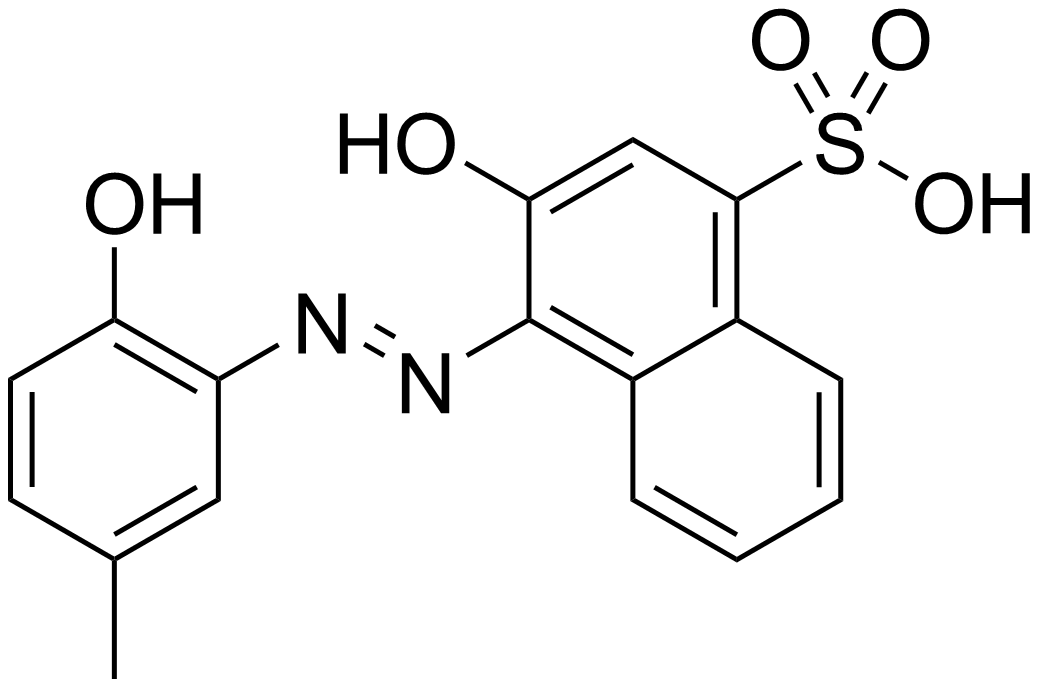
- Skeletal formula

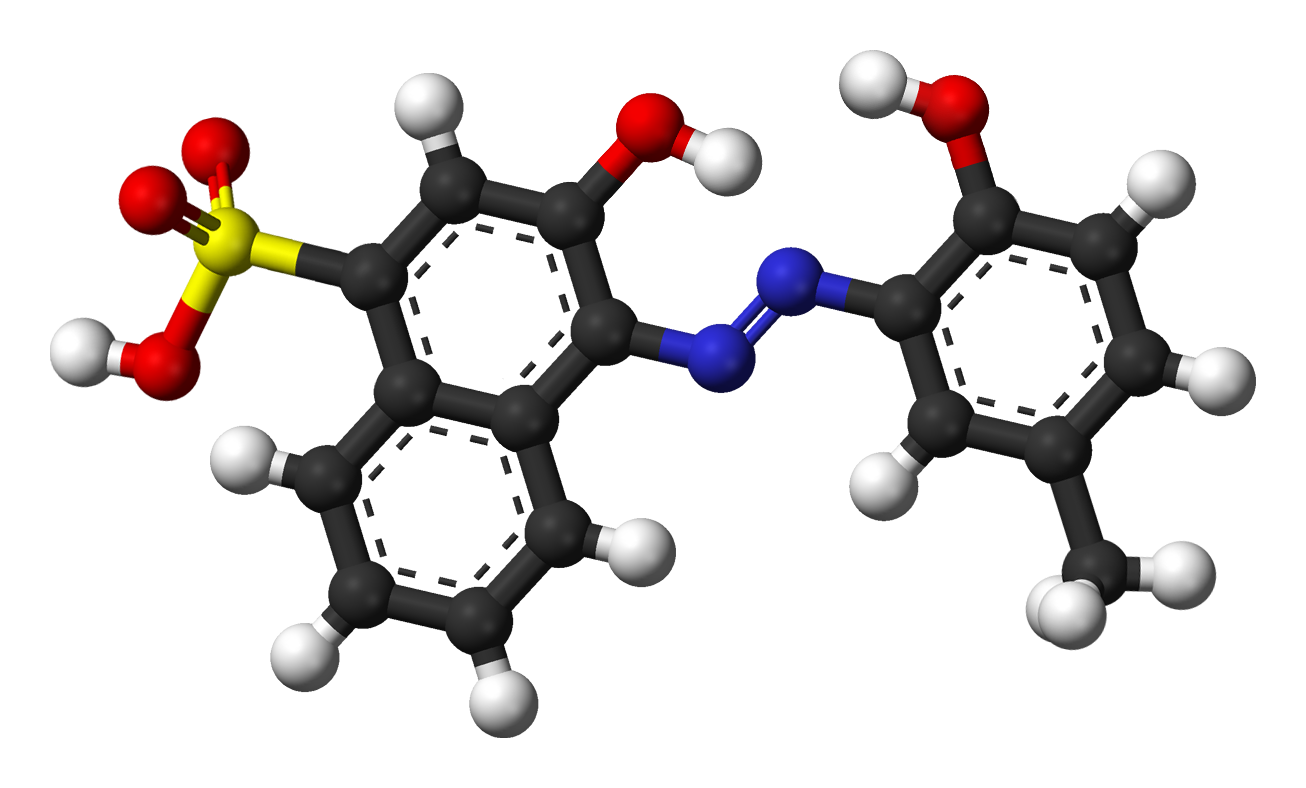
- Ball-and-stick model

Names
- IUPAC name 3-Hydroxy-4-[(2-hydroxy-5-methylphenyl)azo]-1-naphthalenesulfonic acid

Identifiers
CAS Number	3147-14-6
3D model (JSmol)	Interactive image
ChemSpider	21159783
ECHA InfoCard	100.019.603
PubChem CID	5483111
UNII	0A3KVV9HZC
CompTox Dashboard (EPA)	DTXSID8062866
- InChI: InChI=1/C17H14N2O5S/c1-10-6-7-14(20)13(8-10)18-19-17-12-5-3-2-4-11(12)16(9-15(17)21)25(22,23)24/h2-9,20-21H,1H3,(H,22,23,24) Key: VBRNLOQCBCPPHL-UHFFFAOYAD
- SMILES: Oc3ccc(C)cc3N=Nc2c1ccccc1c(cc2O)S(O)(=O)=O

Properties
Chemical formula	C_{17}H_{14}N_{2}O_{5}S
Molar mass	358.37 g·mol^{−1}
Appearance	Red to black crystals
Odor	Phenolic odor
Melting point	330 °C (626 °F; 603 K)

Hazards
- Occupational safety and health (OHS/OSH)
Main hazards	May emit ammonia, oxides of sulfur, oxides of nitrogen, and oxides of carbon.
- Except where otherwise noted, data are given for materials in their standard state (at 25 °C [77 °F], 100 kPa). Infobox references

Calmagite is a complexometric indicator used in analytical chemistry to identify the presence of metal ions in solution. As with other metal ion indicators calmagite will change color when it is bound to an ion. Calmagite will be wine red when it is bound to a metal ion and may be blue, red, or orange when it is not bound to a metal ion. Calmagite is often used in conjunction with EDTA, a stronger metal binding agent. This chemical is also used in the quantitation of magnesium in the clinical laboratory.
