= Rubrocurcumin =

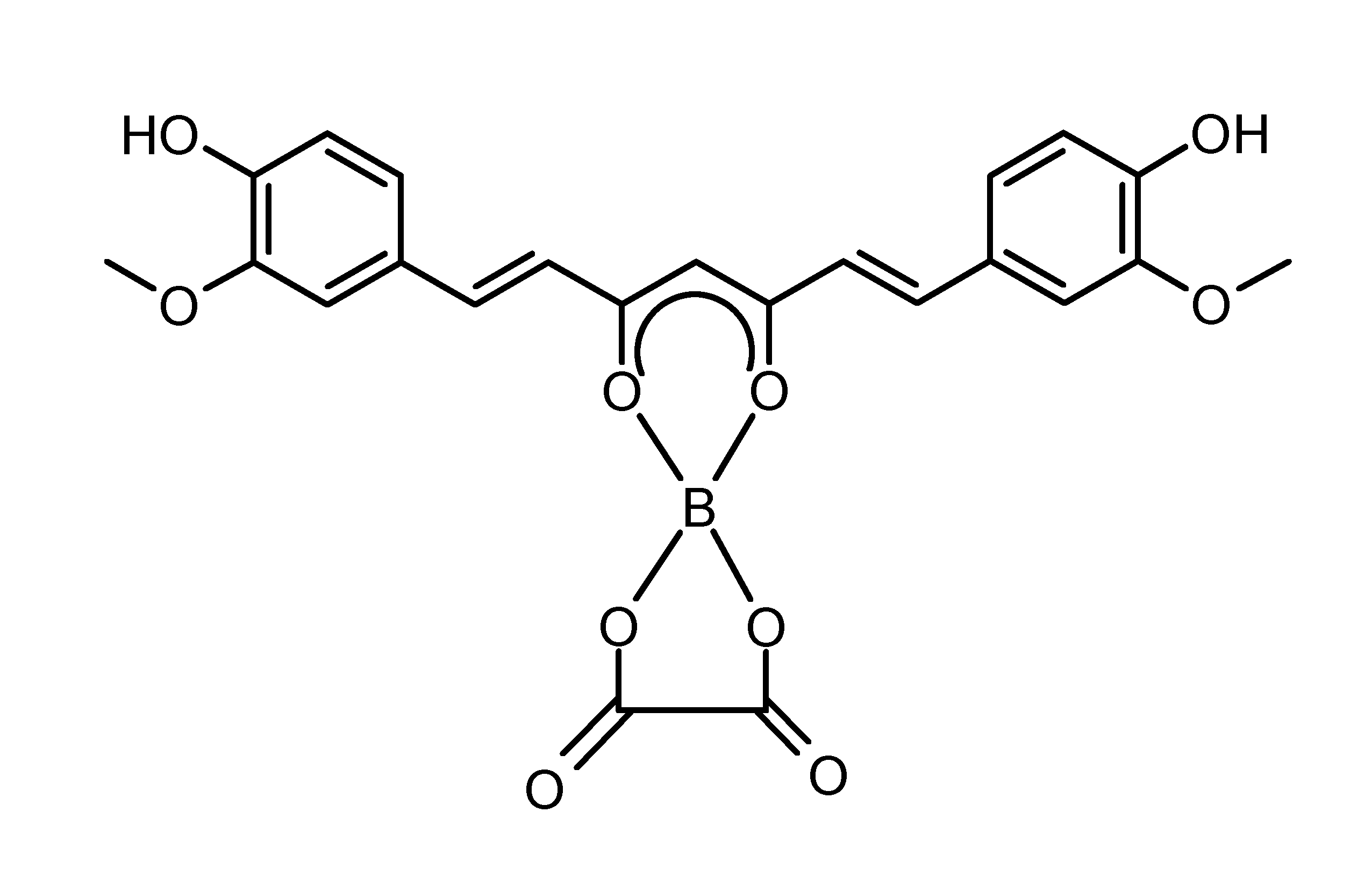

Names
- IUPAC name 2-[(1E,3Z,6E)-1,7-Bis(4-hydroxy-3-methoxyphenyl)-5-oxohepta-1,3,6-trien-3-yl]oxy-1,3,2-dioxaborolane-4,5-dione
- Other names Rubrocurcumin

Identifiers
CAS Number	12098-66-7
3D model (JSmol)	Interactive image
ChemSpider	24751750 Non-charged form; 24751749 Charged form
PubChem CID	57461353
CompTox Dashboard (EPA)	DTXSID90726681
- InChI: InChI=1S/C23H19BO10/c1-30-20-11-14(5-9-18(20)26)3-7-16(25)13-17(32-24-33-22(28)23(29)34-24)8-4-15-6-10-19(27)21(12-15)31-2/h3-13,26-27H,1-2H3/b7-3+,8-4+,17-13- Key: CSMMVHRUFPYHCS-YRLHZMKXSA-N; Charged form: InChI=1S/C23H19BO10/c1-29-20-11-14(5-9-18(20)25)3-7-16-13-17(32-24(31-16)33-22(27)23(28)34-24)8-4-15-6-10-19(26)21(12-15)30-2/h3-13,25-26H,1-2H3/b7-3+,8-4+ Key: YIFZXJZUXMHJJG-FCXRPNKRSA-N
- SMILES: B1(OC(=O)C(=O)O1)O/C(=C\C(=O)/C=C/c2ccc(c(c2)OC)O)/C=C/c3ccc(c(c3)OC)O

Properties
Chemical formula	C_{23}H_{19}BO_{10}
Molar mass	466.21 g·mol^{−1}
Appearance	Red solid
- Except where otherwise noted, data are given for materials in their standard state (at 25 °C [77 °F], 100 kPa). verify (what is ?) Infobox references

Rubrocurcumin is a red-colored dye that is formed by the reaction of curcumin and boric acid.

== Synthesis ==
The reaction of curcumin with borates in presence of oxalic acid produces rubrocurcumin.

== Characteristics ==
Rubrocurcumin produces a red-colored solution.

Rubrocurcumin is a neutral molecule, while rosocyanine is ionic. In rubrocurcumin, one molecule of curcumin is replaced with oxalate compared to rosocyanine.

Complexes with boron such as rubrocurcumin are called 1,3,2-dioxaborines.
