= Purpuric acid =

Names
- IUPAC name 5-[(2,4,6-Trioxo-1,3-diazinan-5-yl)imino]-1,3-diazinane-2,4,6-trione
- Other names 5,5'-Azanylylidene-bis-pyrimidine-2,4,6-trione

Identifiers
CAS Number	121-08-4
3D model (JSmol)	Interactive image
ChemSpider	378346
PubChem CID	427644
CompTox Dashboard (EPA)	DTXSID401336107
- InChI: InChI=1S/C8H5N5O6/c14-3-1(4(15)11-7(18)10-3)9-2-5(16)12-8(19)13-6(2)17/h1H,(H2,10,11,14,15,18)(H2,12,13,16,17,19) Key: VQTZGUYEOZNKQH-UHFFFAOYSA-N
- SMILES: C1(C(=O)NC(=O)NC1=O)N=C2C(=O)NC(=O)NC2=O

Properties
Chemical formula	C_{8}H_{5}N_{5}O_{6}
Molar mass	267.157 g·mol^{−1}
- Except where otherwise noted, data are given for materials in their standard state (at 25 °C [77 °F], 100 kPa). Infobox references

Purpuric acid is a nitrogenous acid related to barbituric acid that yields alloxan and uramil upon hydrolysis. It is noteworthy for its purple-red salts, such as its ammonium salt murexide. Purpuric acid was first described in 1818 by the English chemist William Prout (1785-1850). Though colourless itself, purpuric acid has a tendency to form red or purple-coloured salts with alkaline bases. This characteristic led the English doctor William Hyde Wollaston (1766-1828) to suggest the name purpuric acid.

Purpuric acid can be synthesized by nitration of uric acid (previously known as lithic acid). In 1818, Prout obtained lithic acid from the excrement of a boa constrictor (which largely consists of this substance) or else used urinary calculi. He dissolved the lithic acid in dilute nitric acid and after effervescence took place, a purple liquid was formed. After neutralization of the solution with ammonia, granular crystals begin to separate out.

Purpuric acid is insoluble in alcohol and ether. The mineral acids dissolve it only when they are concentrated. It does not affect litmus paper. Purpuric acid combines with the alkalis, alkaline earths, and metallic oxides. It is capable of expelling carbonic acid from the alkaline carbonates, by the assistance of heat, and does not combine with any other acid. Wollaston believed that these characteristics were sufficient to distinguish it from an oxide, and to establish its character as an acid.
