= Tribochromism =

Tribochromism refers to a change in colour of a material caused by mechanical friction, similar to piezochromism, the change in colour of a material caused by pressure. It is a property of some materials and is often associated with thermochromism. Tribochromism and piezochromism are often grouped together under the term mechanochromism.

Tribochromatic materials may be used in sensors when friction has to be detected. These materials generally change colour under mechanical stress conditions; the colour gradually fades once the stress is removed.

== See also ==
- Triboluminescence – An optical phenomenon in which light is generated when material is subject to mechanical stress
