= 5-Methyl-2-((2-nitrophenyl)amino)-3-thiophenecarbonitrile =

Organic compound

5-Methyl-2-[(2-nitrophenyl)amino]-3-thiophenecarbonitrile

Names
- Preferred IUPAC name 5-Methyl-2-[(2-nitrophenyl)amino]-3-thiophenecarbonitrile
- Other names ROY

Identifiers
CAS Number	138564-59-7
3D model (JSmol)	Interactive image
ChEMBL	ChEMBL1990114
ChemSpider	350550
ECHA InfoCard	100.101.989
PubChem CID	395460
UNII	J7X181M78Y
CompTox Dashboard (EPA)	DTXSID40160713
- InChI: InChI=1S/C12H9N3O2S/c1-8-6-9(7-13)12(18-8)14-10-4-2-3-5-11(10)15(16)17/h2-6,14H,1H3 Key: NPXUFPFFHANGDL-UHFFFAOYSA-N
- SMILES: Cc1cc(c(s1)Nc2ccccc2[N+](=O)[O-])C#N

Properties
Chemical formula	C_{12}H_{9}N_{3}O_{2}S
Molar mass	259.28 g·mol^{−1}
Melting point	99–102 °C (210–216 °F; 372–375 K)

Hazards
- GHS labelling
Pictograms	(GHS09: Environmental hazard)
Signal word	Warning
Hazard statements	H410
Precautionary statements	P273, P391, P501
- Except where otherwise noted, data are given for materials in their standard state (at 25 °C [77 °F], 100 kPa). Infobox references

5-Methyl-2-[(2-nitrophenyl)amino]-3-thiophenecarbonitrile, also known as ROY (red-orange-yellow), is an organic compound which is a chemical intermediate to the drug olanzapine. It has been the subject of intensive study because it can exist in multiple well-characterised crystalline polymorphic forms.

== Synthesis ==
The preparation of ROY was first disclosed in a series of patents from Eli Lilly & Co. in the 1990s, which covered the pharmaceutical active ingredient later marketed as olanzapine. In the first step, a Gewald reaction using propionaldehyde, sulfur and malononitrile formed the thiophene ring system, as 2-amino-5-methylthiophene-3-carbonitrile. The amino group was then reacted with 2-fluoro-nitrobenzene in tetrahydrofuran to provide 5-methyl-2-[(2-nitrophenyl)amino]-3-thiophenecarbonitrile.

== Polymorphism ==
ROY has been crystallised in at least thirteen polymorphic forms. In an increasing order of stability, they are Y, YT04, R, OP, YN, Y04, R05, PO13, ON, ORP, R18, RPL, and Y19. Five of them, including red, orange and yellow examples, are shown in the accompanying image.

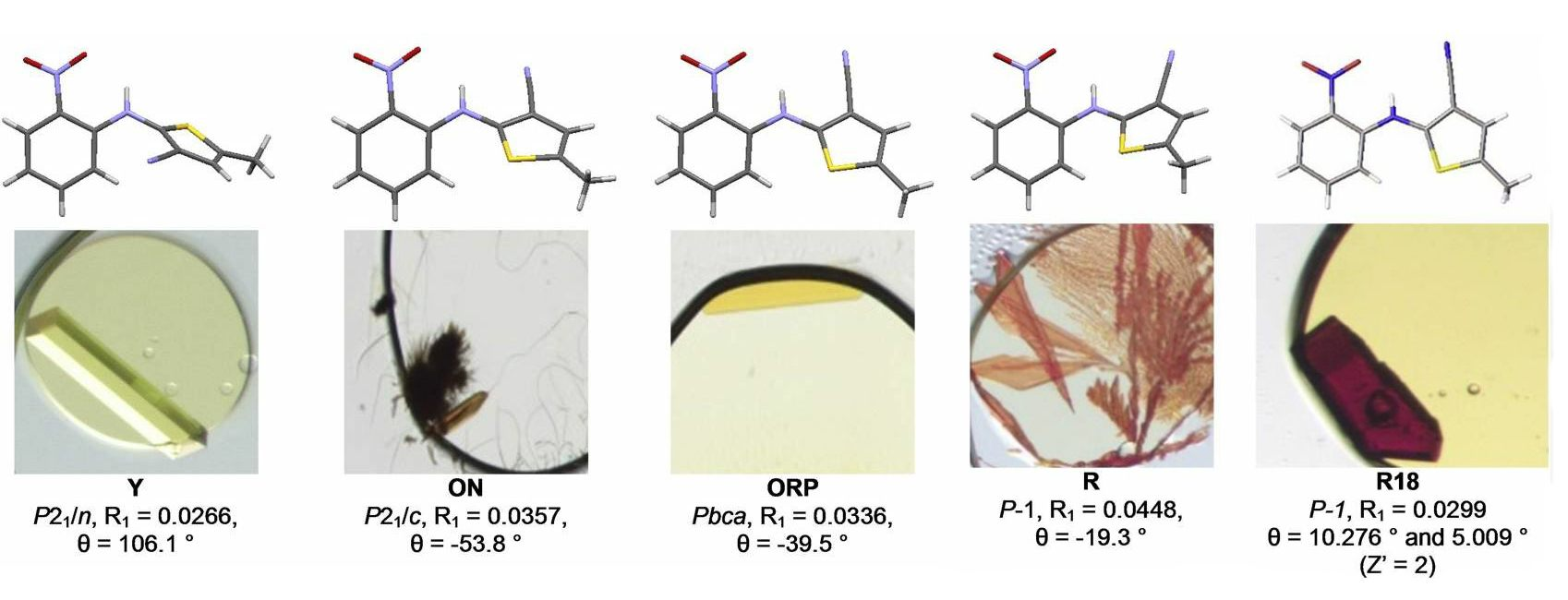
Five major polymorphs of ROY

When this ability to form multiple crystalline versions of different colours was reviewed in 2010, it was described as "extraordinary", particularly because many alternatives can crystallise simultaneously from a single solvent. As the thermodynamic properties of the various versions have been established, ROY has become an important test of computational models. By 2020, ROY held the record for having the largest number of well-characterised polymorphs, with its nearest competitors being aripiprazole and galunisertib. The various crystal forms display alternative conformers, a type of stereoisomerism where rotation at single bonds leads to a distinct three-dimensional configuration in the solid. The molecule is piezochromic, with yellow and pale orange crystalline forms which transform reversibly to red at high pressure.

In 2022, it was suggested that all the ROY polymorphs (i.e. the 13 then known) which are stable at ambient pressure had already been found and characterised. This work also calculated that additional polymorphs might be discovered using high pressures of about 10 GPa. However, in 2025, a 14th polymorph was described and designated O22. It had been produced using high-throughput Encapsulated Nanodroplet Crystallization.
