= Gasochromism =

Gasochromism is closely related to electrochromism. The process involves the interaction of an electrochrome, usually a metal oxide, such as tungsten oxide, with an oxidizing or reducing gas, commonly oxygen and hydrogen, producing reversible color changes. The gasochromic technology is used commercially in reversible smart windows and gas sensing of oxygen, hydrogen, nitric oxide, hydrogen sulphide and carbon monoxide.
