= Eriochrome Black T =

- Wireframe model of an eriochrome black T minor tautomer

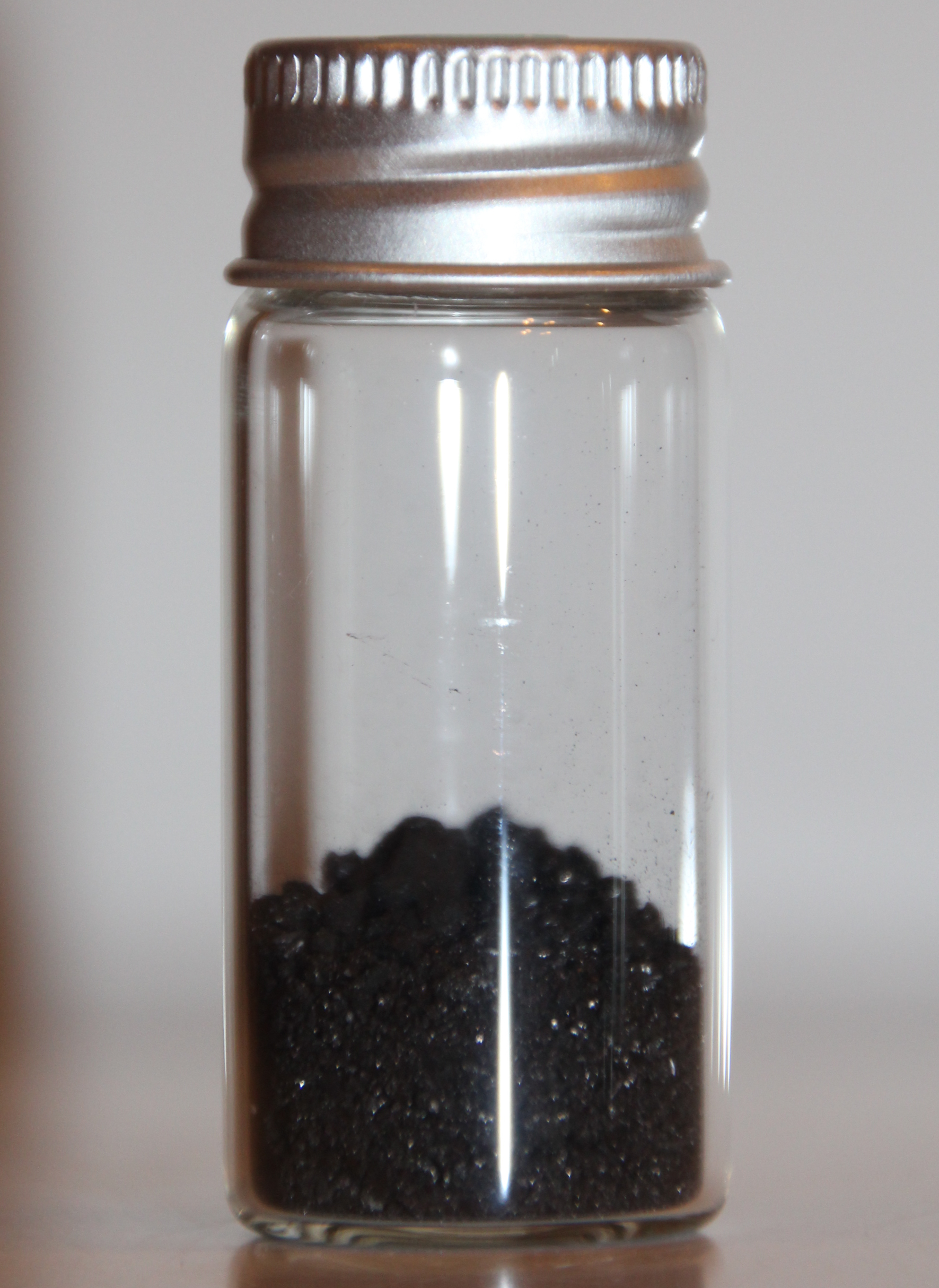
- Sample of Eriochrome Black T

Names
- Preferred IUPAC name Sodium 1-[1-Hydroxynaphthylazo]-6-nitro-2-naphthol-4-sulfonate
- Systematic IUPAC name Sodium 4-[2-(1-hydroxynaphthalen-2-yl)hydrazin-1-ylidene]-7-nitro-3-oxo-3,4-dihydronaphthalene-1-sulfonate
- Other names Sodium 4-[2-(1-hydroxynaphthalen-2-yl)hydrazin-1-ylidene]-7-nitro-3-oxonaphthalene-1-sulfonate; Solochrome Black T; ET-00; Erio T

Identifiers
| CAS Number | 1787-61-7 |
| 3D model (JSmol) | Interactive image |
| Abbreviations | EBT |
| Beilstein Reference | 4121162 |
| ChemSpider | 10483790 |
| ECHA InfoCard | 100.015.683 |
| EC Number | 217-250-3 |
| MeSH | Eriochrome+black+T |
| PubChem CID | 6808871; 5359641 (4E); 5351620 |
| RTECS number | QK2197000 |
| UNII | MPC0KHJ23C |
| UN number | 2923 |
| CompTox Dashboard (EPA) | DTXSID4061969 |
- InChI: InChI=1S/C20H13N3O7S.Na/c24-17-10-18(31(28,29)30)15-9-12(23(26)27)6-7-14(15)19(17)22-21-16-8-5-11-3-1-2-4-13(11)20(16)25;/h1-10,24-25H,(H,28,29,30);/q;+1/p-1/b22-21+; Key: AMMWFYKTZVIRFN-QUABFQRHSA-M
- SMILES: C1=CC=C2C(=C1)C=CC(=C2O)/N=N/C3=C4C=CC(=CC4=C(C=C3O)S(=O)(=O)[O-])[N+](=O)[O-].[Na+]

Properties
| Chemical formula | C_{20}H_{12}N_{3}O_{7}SNa |
| Molar mass | 461.381 g/mol |
| Appearance | dark red/brown powder |
| Acidity (pK_{a}) | 6.2, 11.55 |
- Except where otherwise noted, data are given for materials in their standard state (at 25 °C [77 °F], 100 kPa). verify (what is ?) Infobox references

Eriochrome Black T is a complexometric indicator that is used in complexometric titrations, e.g. in the water hardness determination process. It is an azo dye. Eriochrome is a trademark of Huntsman Petrochemical, LLC.

In its deprotonated form, Eriochrome Black T is blue. It turns red when it forms a complex with calcium, magnesium, or other metal ions.

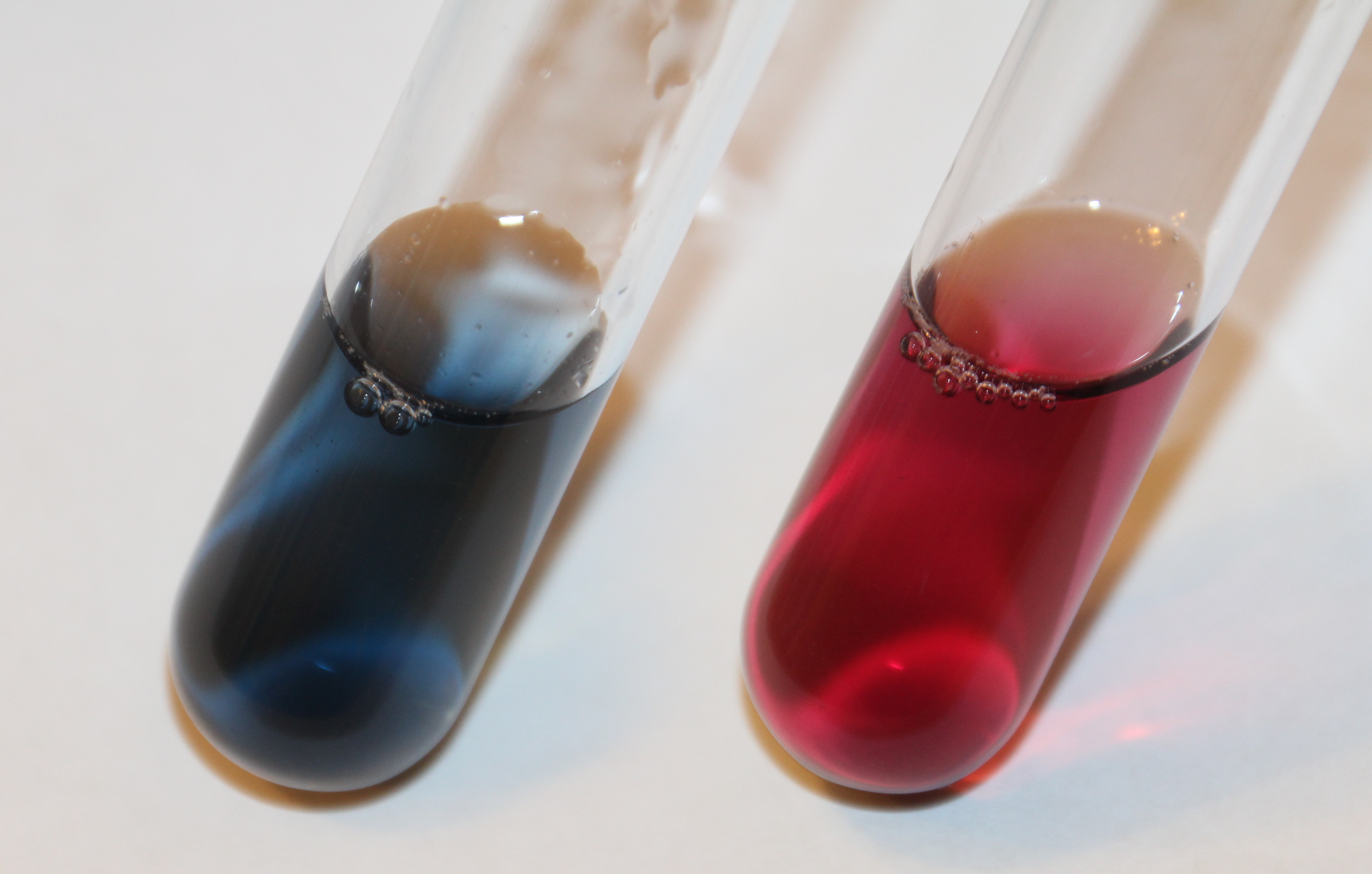
EBT is blue in a buffered solution at pH 10. It turns red when Ca^{2+} ions are added.

== Applications ==
When used as an indicator in an EDTA titration, the characteristic blue end-point is reached when sufficient EDTA is added and the metal ions bound to the indicator are chelated by EDTA, leaving the free indicator molecule.

Eriochrome Black T has also been used to detect the presence of rare earth metals.
