= Calcein =

Fluorescent dye and complexometric indicator

Names
- Preferred IUPAC name 2,2′,2′′,2′′′-[(3′,6′-Dihydroxy-3-oxo-3H-spiro[[2]benzofuran-1,9′-xanthene]-2′,7′-diyl)bis(methylenenitrilo)]tetraacetic acid
- Other names Fluorexon

Identifiers
CAS Number	1461-15-0
3D model (JSmol)	Interactive image; Interactive image
ChEBI	CHEBI:51903
ChEMBL	ChEMBL1973733
ChemSpider	58589
ECHA InfoCard	100.014.507
PubChem CID	65079
UNII	V0YM2B16TS
CompTox Dashboard (EPA)	DTXSID8045856
- InChI: InChI=1S/C30H26N2O13/c33-21-7-23-19(5-15(21)9-31(11-25(35)36)12-26(37)38)30(18-4-2-1-3-17(18)29(43)45-30)20-6-16(22(34)8-24(20)44-23)10-32(13-27(39)40)14-28(41)42/h1-8,33-34H,9-14H2,(H,35,36)(H,37,38)(H,39,40)(H,41,42) Key: DEGAKNSWVGKMLS-UHFFFAOYSA-N
- SMILES: O=C(O5)c1ccccc1C(c3cc(CN(CC(O)=O)CC(O)=O)c(O)cc3O4)5c2c4cc(O)c(CN(CC(O)=O)CC(O)=O)c2; c1ccc2c(c1)C(=O)OC23c4cc(c(cc4Oc5c3cc(c(c5)O)CN(CC(=O)O)CC(=O)O)O)CN(CC(=O)O)CC(=O)O

Properties
Chemical formula	C_{30}H_{26}N_{2}O_{13}
Molar mass	622.53 g/mol
Melting point	Decomposes
Boiling point	N/A
Solubility in water	Slightly soluble
- Except where otherwise noted, data are given for materials in their standard state (at 25 °C [77 °F], 100 kPa). verify (what is ?) Infobox references

Calcein, also known as fluorexon, fluorescein complex, is a fluorescent dye with excitation and emission wavelengths of 495 and 515 nm, respectively, and has the appearance of orange crystals. Calcein self-quenches at concentrations above 70 mM and is commonly used as an indicator of lipid vesicle leakage. It has also been traditionally used as a complexometric indicator for titration of calcium ions with EDTA, and for fluorometric determination of calcium.

== Applications ==
After Calcein-AM is taken up into the cell, it is converted by esterases into calcein (below). This is capable of complexing calcium ions, resulting in a green fluorescence. Since only living cells possess sufficient esterases, only live cells fluoresce green after excitation

The non-fluorescent acetomethoxy derivate of calcein (calcein AM, AM = acetoxymethyl) is used in biology as it can be transported through the cellular membrane into live cells, which makes it useful for testing of cell viability and for short-term labeling of cells. Alternatively, Fura-2, Furaptra, Indo-1 and aequorin may be used. An acetomethoxy group obscures the part of the molecule that chelates Ca^{2+}, Mg^{2+}, Zn^{2+} and other ions. After transport into the cells, intracellular esterases remove the acetomethoxy group, the molecule gets trapped inside and gives out strong green fluorescence. As dead cells lack active esterases, only live cells are labeled and counted by flow cytometry.

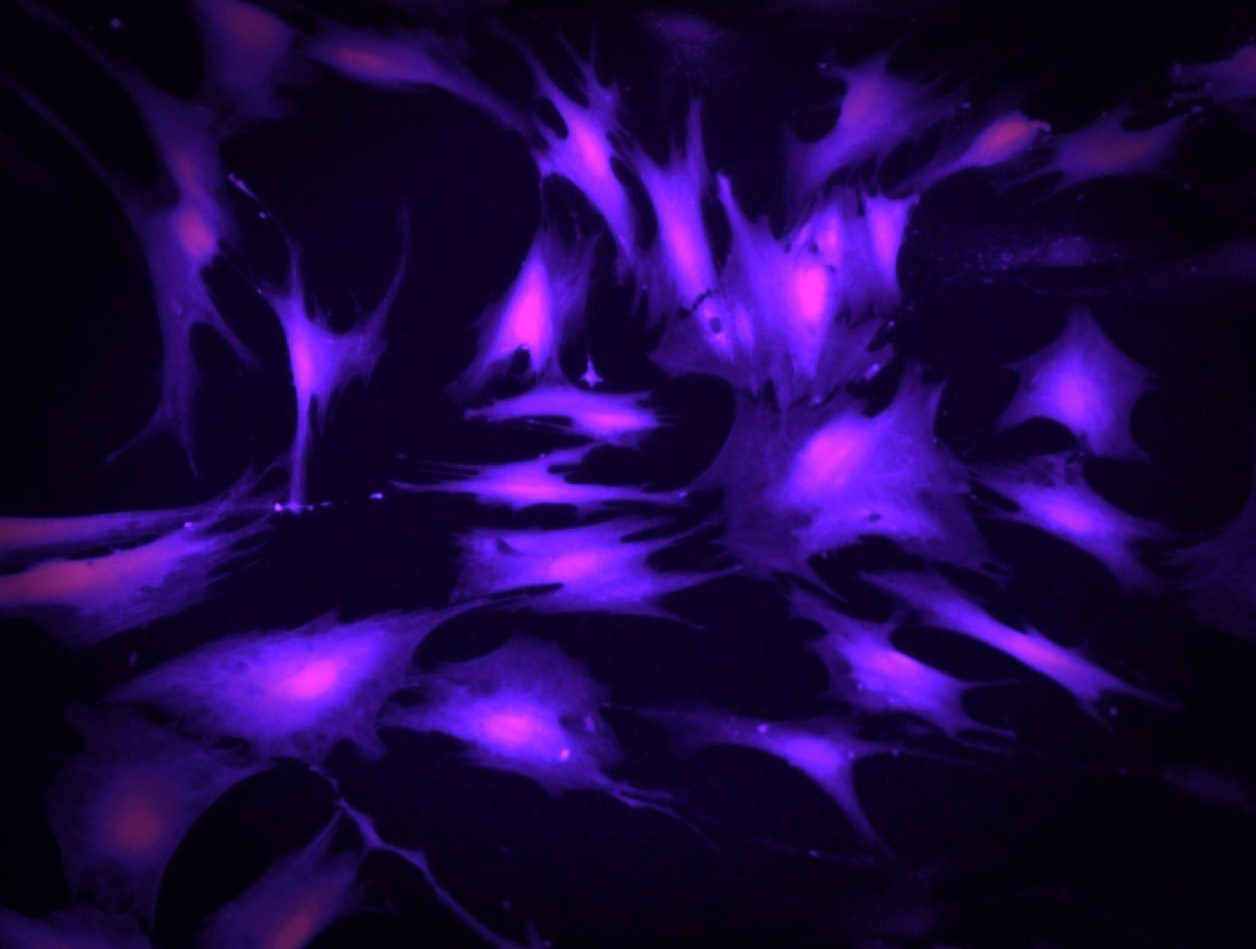
Human neonatal human dermal fibroblasts stained with calcein-AM, imaged with a monochromatic microscope, and pseudocolored.

Calcein is now rarely used as a Ca^{2+} or Mg^{2+} indicator because its fluorescence is directly sensitive to these ions only at strongly alkaline pH, and thus it is not particularly useful for measuring Ca^{2+} or Mg^{2+} in cells. Fluorescence of calcein is quenched strongly by Co^{2+}, Ni^{2+} and Cu^{2+} and appreciably by Fe^{3+} and Mn^{2+} at physiological pH. This fluorescence quenching response can be exploited for detecting the opening of the mitochondrial permeability transition pore (mPTP) and for measuring cell volume changes. Calcein is commonly used for cell tracing and in studies of endocytosis, cell migration, and gap junctions.

The acetoxymethyl ester of calcein is also used to detect drug interactions with multidrug resistance proteins (ABC transporters ATP-binding cassette transporter genes) in intact cells as it is an excellent substrate of the multidrug resistance transporter 1 (MDR1) P-glycoprotein and the Multidrug Resistance-Associated Protein (MRP1). The calcein AM assay can be used as a model for drug-drug interactions, for screening transporter substrates and/or inhibitors; and also to determine in vitro drug resistance of cells, including samples from patients.

Calcein is also used for marking freshly hatched fish and for labeling of bones in live animals.
