= Rosocyanine =

Names
- IUPAC name 2-methoxy-4-[(E)-2-[2,4,10-tris[(E)-2-(4-hydroxy-3-methoxyphenyl)ethenyl]-1,5,7,11-tetraoxa-6-boroniaspiro[5.5]undecan-8-yl]ethenyl]phenol;chloride
- Other names Rosocyanine

Identifiers
CAS Number	37204-72-1
3D model (JSmol)	Interactive image
ChemSpider	21106498
PubChem CID	57473111
CompTox Dashboard (EPA)	DTXSID60726815
- InChI: InChI=1S/C42H44BO12.ClH/c1-48-39-21-27(9-17-35(39)44)5-13-31-25-32(14-6-28-10-18-36(45)40(22-28)49-2)53-43(52-31)54-33(15-7-29-11-19-37(46)41(23-29)50-3)26-34(55-43)16-8-30-12-20-38(47)42(24-30)51-4;/h5-24,31-34,44-47H,25-26H2,1-4H3;1H/q+1;/p-1/b13-5+,14-6+,15-7+,16-8+; Key: XZWTYNUGOWPDCM-JWMINOHISA-M; InChI=1S/C42H44BO12.ClH/c1-48-39-21-27(9-17-35(39)44)5-13-31-25-32(14-6-28-10-18-36(45)40(22-28)49-2)53-43(52-31)54-33(15-7-29-11-19-37(46)41(23-29)50-3)26-34(55-43)16-8-30-12-20-38(47)42(24-30)51-4;/h5-24,31-34,44-47H,25-26H2,1-4H3;1H/q+1;/p-1/b13-5+,14-6+,15-7+,16-8+; Key: XZWTYNUGOWPDCM-JWMINOHISA-M
- SMILES: [Cl-].Oc1ccc(cc1OC)/C=C/C5CC(O[B@+]3(OC(CC(/C=C/c2ccc(O)c(OC)c2)O3)/C=C/c4ccc(O)c(OC)c4)O5)/C=C/c6ccc(O)c(OC)c6

Properties
Chemical formula	[B(C_{21}H_{19}O_{6})_{2}]Cl (as chloride)
Molar mass	781.013 g/mol
Appearance	dark-green colored solid
- Except where otherwise noted, data are given for materials in their standard state (at 25 °C [77 °F], 100 kPa). verify (what is ?) Infobox references

Rosocyanine and rubrocurcumin are two red colored materials, which are formed by the reaction between curcumin and borates.

== Application ==
The color reaction between borates and curcumin is used for the spectrophotometric determination and quantification of boron present in food or materials. Curcumin is a yellow coloring natural pigment found in the root stocks of some Curcuma species, especially Curcuma longa (turmeric), in concentrations up to 3%. In the so-called curcumin method for boron quantification it serves as reaction partner for boric acid. The reaction is very sensitive and so the smallest quantities of boron can be detected. The maximum absorbance at 540 nm for rosocyanine is used in this colorimetric method. The formation of rosocyanine depends on the reaction conditions. The reaction is carried out preferentially in acidic solutions containing hydrochloric or sulfuric acid. The color reaction also takes place under different conditions; however, in alkaline solution, gradual decomposition is observed. The reaction might be disturbed at higher pH values, interfering with other compounds.

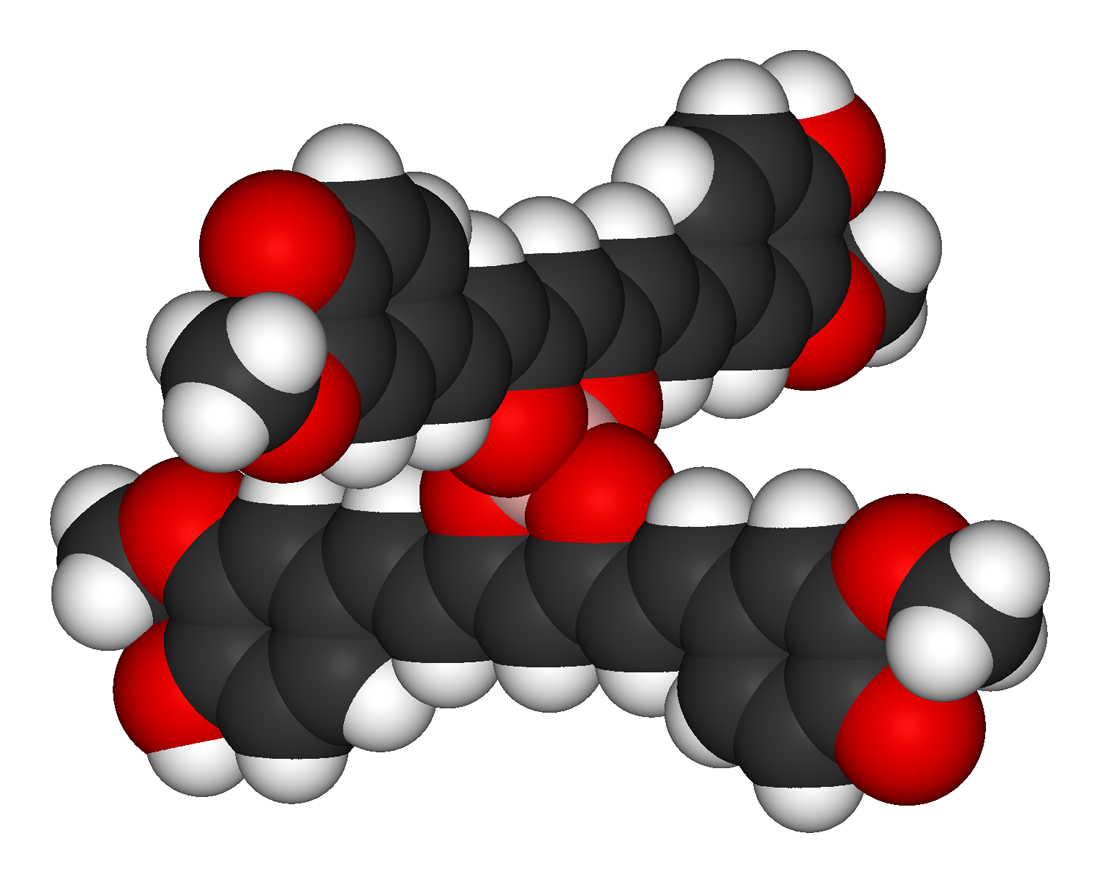
Space filling model

Rosocyanine is formed as a 2:1 complex from curcumin and boric acid in acidic solutions. The boron complexes formed with rosocyanine are dioxaborines (here a 1,3,2-dioxaborine). Curcumin possesses a 1,3-diketone structure and can therefore be considered as a chelating agent. Unlike the simpler 1,3-diketone–containing compound acetylacetone (which forms acetylacetonate complexes with metals), the entire skeleton of curcumin is in resonance with the 1,3-dicarbonyl section, making the backbone an extended conjugated system. Investigations of the structure have shown that the positive charge is distributed throughout the molecule. In rosocyanine, the two curcumin moieties are not coplanar but rather perpendicular relative to one another (as seen in the 3D model), as a result of the tetrahedral geometry of tetracoordinate boron. The same applies to rubrocurcumin.

In order to exclude the presence of other materials during the boron quantification using the curcumin method, a variant of the process was developed. In this process, 2,2-dimethyl-1,3-hexanediol or 2-ethyl-1,3-hexanediol are added, in addition to curcumin, to a neutral solution of the boron-containing solution. The complex formed between boron and the 1,3-hexanediol derivative is removed from the aqueous solution by extraction in an organic solvent. Acidification of the organic phase yields rubrocyanine, which can be detected by colorimetric methods. The reaction of curcumin with borates in presence of oxalic acid produces the coloring compound rubrocurcumin.

== Characteristics ==
Rosocyanine is a dark green solid with a glossy, metallic shine that forms red colored solutions. It is almost insoluble in water and some organic solvents, very slightly soluble (up to 0.01%) in ethanol, and somewhat soluble (approximately 1%) in pyridine, sulfuric acid, and acetic acid. An alcoholic solution of rosocyanine temporarily turns deeply blue on treatment with alkali.

In rubrocurcumin one molecule of curcumin is replaced with oxalic acid. Rubrocurcumin produces a similar red colored solution. Rosocyanine is an ionic compound, while rubrocurcumin is a neutral complex.

== See also ==
- Curcuminoids
