= Johann Georg Noel Dragendorff =

German pharmacist and chemist (1836–1898)

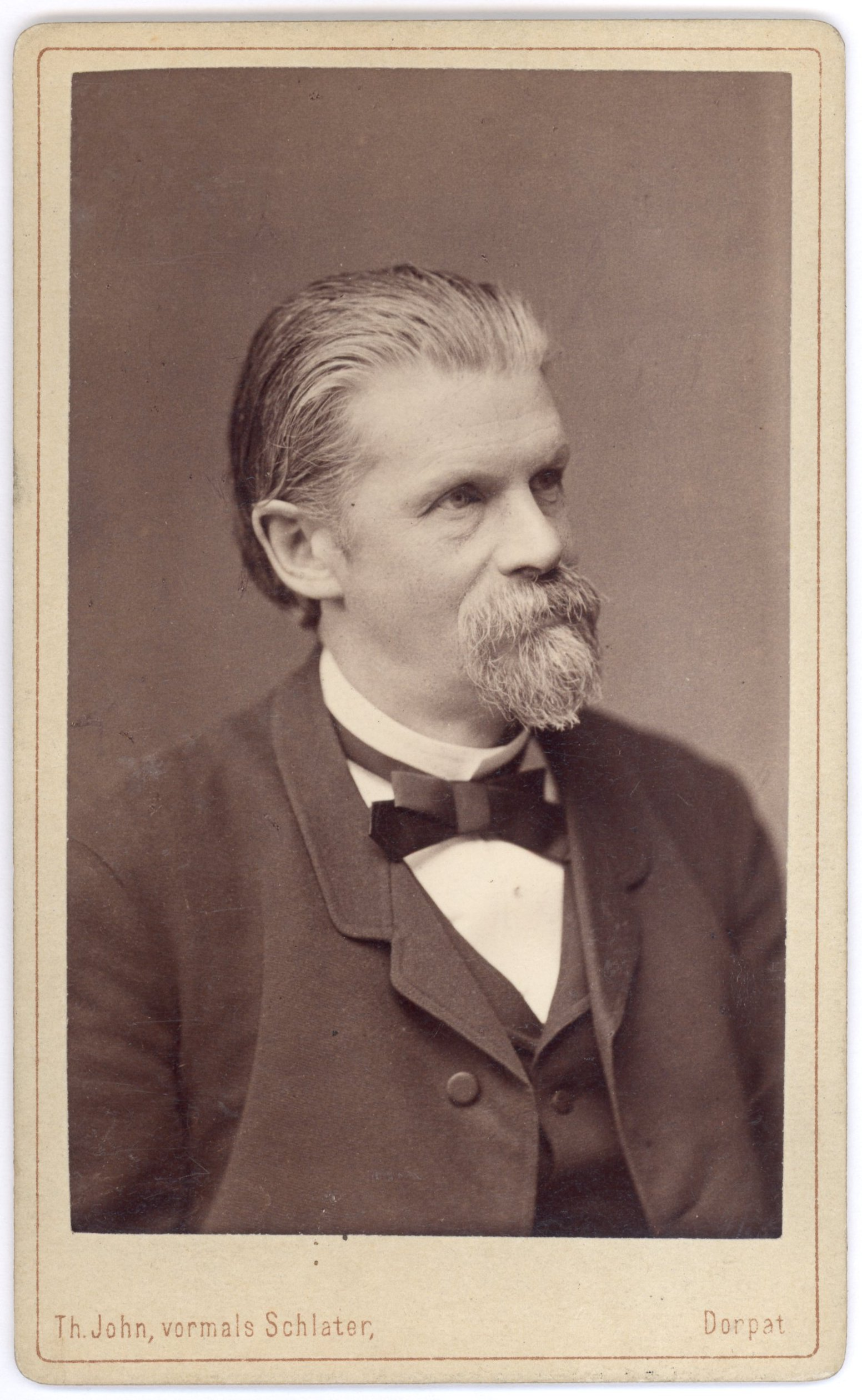
Johann Georg Noel Dragendorff (1836-1898)

Johann Georg Noel Dragendorff (20 April 1836 – 7 April 1898 in Rostock) was a German pharmacist and chemist born in Rostock, today Germany, formerly Prussia.

== Education ==
He passed the pharmacy exam at the University of Rostock in 1858. He continued his studies at the University of Rostock and Heidelberg University. His father, Ludwig, was a practicing physician and occasionally gave lectures at the University of Rostock. In 1853, Dragendorff began his apprenticeship as a pharmacist at the Witte family's Hirsch pharmacy. In 1856, he successfully passed the pharmacy exam and worked for a time at the Witte pharmacy. He then moved to the court pharmacy in Doberan (a city in northwest Germany) and opened a branch in Heiligendamm. In 1861, he defended his doctorate with the dissertation "Effects of phosphorus on some carbonic and boric compounds with acid salt." Dragendorff gained research experience in the fields of plant analysis, plant physiology, and agrochemistry while working as an assistant in the laboratory of Franz Schultze, professor at the University of Rostock, from 1860 to 1862. In 1862, he was invited to edit the journal "Pharmaceutische Zeitschrift für Russland" of the Herbal Society of St. Petersburg. There he continued his pedagogical training, teaching pharmacy and pharmacognosy to pharmacy students in St. Petersburg. In May 1864, Dragendorff passed his master's examinations and graduated in pharmacy from the University of Dorpat in September of the same year. He obtained his master's degree for his thesis "Chemistry and the Study of Fungi on White Birch and Related Species." From 1864 to 1894, he was director of the Institute of Pharmacy at the University of Tartu and a professor. In 1872, he was awarded an honorary doctorate in medicine from the Ludwig-Maximilians-Universität München. From 1882 to 1887, he was vice-rector of the University of Tartu and, from 1890 to 1892, dean of the Faculty of Medicine. He was president of the Estonian Society of Naturalists from 1890 to 1893. He published research in the fields of forensic chemistry, pharmacognosy, food analysis, environmental chemistry, pharmacology, toxicology, and others. After thirty years of work in Tartu (today Estonia, then part of the Russian Empire), Dragendorff returned to Rostock in 1894, where he died of heart disease on 7 April 1898. Dragendorff was buried in his hometown; his grave is covered by a four-meter-high obelisk of black granite. His Russian students raised funds for a memorial tablet on his grave. The remains of this tablet are now in Linden Park. On his obelisk, one can read the inscription: "Seine dankbaren schüler in russland" (Your grateful students in Russia). He earned his doctorate in philosophy from the University of Rostock in 1861.

He received the Hanbury Medal in 1885.

== Dragendorff's reagent and Dragendorff's test ==
His name is associated with Dragendorff's reagent, which is a solution of potassium bismuth iodide used to ascertain the presence of alkaloids. Dragendorff's test is a qualitative test formerly used for bile.

== Selected publications ==
- Beiträge zur gerichtlichen Chemie (Contributions to forensic chemistry); (1871)
- Die gerichtlichchemische Ermittelung von Giften (Forensic chemical ascertainment of toxins); (1876)
- Die qualitative und quantitative Analyse von Pflanzen und Pflanzentheilen (Qualitative and quantitative analysis of plants); (1882)
- Die Heilpflanzen der verschiedenen Völker und Zeiten. Ihre Anwendung, wesentlichen Bestandtheile und Geschichte (Medicinal plants of various peoples and times); (1898)

== Literature ==
- Wilhelm Katner (1959). "Dragendorff, Johann Georg Noël". Neue Deutsche Biographie (in German). Vol. 4. Berlin: Duncker & Humblot. p. 99. (full text online).
- Ursula Kokoska: Johann Georg Noel Dragendorff (20.4.1836-7.4.1898). Sein Beitrag zur Gerichtsmedizin, Pharmakologie und Pharmazie an der Universität Dorpat. (Inaugural dissertation to the Free University of Berlin; Berlin, 1983)
- Julius Leopold Pagel (1904). "Dragendorff, Georg" . Allgemeine Deutsche Biographie (in German). Vol. 48. Leipzig: Duncker & Humblot. pp. 69–70.
- Hendrik Randow: Ein Beitrag zur Biographie von Georg Dragendorff (1836-1898). Sein Leben und Wirken für die pharmazeutische Forschung und Lehre. (In: Mecklenburgische Persönlichkeiten und ihre Beiträge zum wissenschaftlich-technischen Fortschritt in der Geschichte. Heft 13 der Reihe Rostocker Wissenschaftshistorische Manuskripte, publ. by the History Department of the Wilhelm Pieck University, Rostock, 1986, pp. 42–47)
- Dragendorff, Johann Georg Noël in BBLD - Baltisches biografisches Lexikon digital (digitalised)
- Grewolls, Grete (2011). Wer war wer in Mecklenburg und Vorpommern. Das Personenlexikon (in German). Rostock: Hinstorff Verlag. p. 2236. ISBN 978-3-356-01301-6.
