= Vapochromism =

In chemistry, Vapochromism strongly overlaps with solvatochromism since vapochromic systems are ones in which dyes change colour in response to the vapour of an organic compound or gas. Vapochromic devices are the optical branch of electronic noses. The main applications are in sensors for detecting volatile organic compounds (VOCs) in a variety of environments, including industrial, domestic and medical areas. An example of such a device is an array consisting of a metalloporphyrin (Lewis acid), a pH indicator dye and a solvatochromic dye. The array is scanned with a flat-bed recorder, and the result are compared with a library of known VOCs. Vaporchromic materials are sometimes Pt or Au complexes, which undergo distinct color changes when exposed to VOCs.
