= Alloxan =

Alloxan
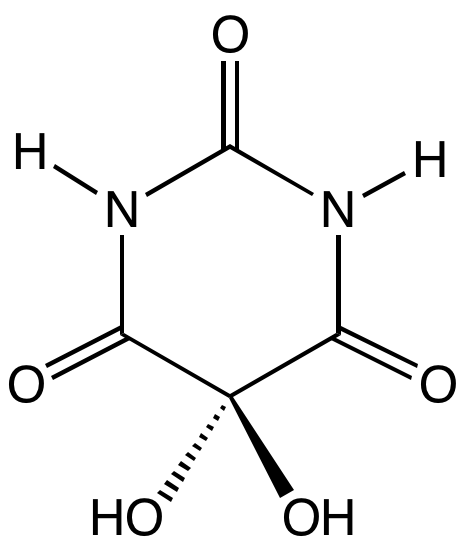
Alloxan monohydrate

Names
- Preferred IUPAC name 5,5-Dihydroxypyrimidine-2,4,6(1H,3H,5H)-trione
- Other names 5,5-Dihydroxybarbituric acid

Identifiers
CAS Number	50-71-5 (Anhydrous); 3237-50-1 (monohydrate)
3D model (JSmol)	Interactive image
ChEBI	CHEBI:76451
ChEMBL	ChEMBL1096009
ChemSpider	5577
ECHA InfoCard	100.000.057
EC Number	200-062-0
MeSH	Alloxan
PubChem CID	5781
UNII	6SW5YHA5NG (anhydrous); O2AAP9F8B6 (monohydrate)
CompTox Dashboard (EPA)	DTXSID5044946
- InChI: InChI=1S/C4H2N2O4/c7-1-2(8)5-4(10)6-3(1)9/h(H2,5,6,8,9,10) Key: HIMXGTXNXJYFGB-UHFFFAOYSA-N; InChI=1/C4H2N2O4/c7-1-2(8)5-4(10)6-3(1)9/h(H2,5,6,8,9,10) Key: HIMXGTXNXJYFGB-UHFFFAOYAQ
- SMILES: C1(=O)C(=O)NC(=O)NC1=O

Properties
Chemical formula	C_{4}H_{4}N_{2}O_{5} (monohydrate)
Molar mass	160.07 g/mol
Appearance	pale yellow solid
Density	1.639 g/cm^{3} (anhydrous)
Melting point	254 °C (489 °F; 527 K) (decomposition)
Solubility in water	0.29 g/100 mL

Hazards
Safety data sheet (SDS)	MSDS
- Except where otherwise noted, data are given for materials in their standard state (at 25 °C [77 °F], 100 kPa). verify (what is ?) Infobox references

Alloxan, sometimes referred to as alloxan monohydrate, is an organic compound with the formula OC(NHCO)_{2}C(OH)_{2}. It is classified as a derivative of pyrimidine. The anhydrous derivative OC(NHCO)_{2}CO is also known, as well as a dimeric derivative. These are some of the earliest known organic compounds. They exhibit a variety of biological activities.

== History and literature ==
The compound was discovered by Justus von Liebig and Friedrich Wöhler. It is one of the oldest named organic compounds. It was originally prepared in 1818 by Luigi Valentino Brugnatelli (1761-1818) and was named in 1838 by Wöhler and Liebig. The name "Alloxan" emerged from an amalgamation of the words "Allantoïn" and "Oxalsäure" (oxalic acid). The alloxan model of diabetes was first described in rabbits by Dunn, Sheehan, and McLetchie in 1943. The name is derived from allantoin, a product of uric acid excreted by the fetus into the allantois, and oxaluric acid derived from oxalic acid and urea, found in urine.

Alloxan was used in the production of the purple dye murexide, discovered by Carl Wilhelm Scheele in 1776. Murexide is the product of the complex in-situ multistep reaction of alloxantin and gaseous ammonia. Murexide results from the condensation of the unisolated intermediate uramil with alloxan liberated during the course of the reaction.

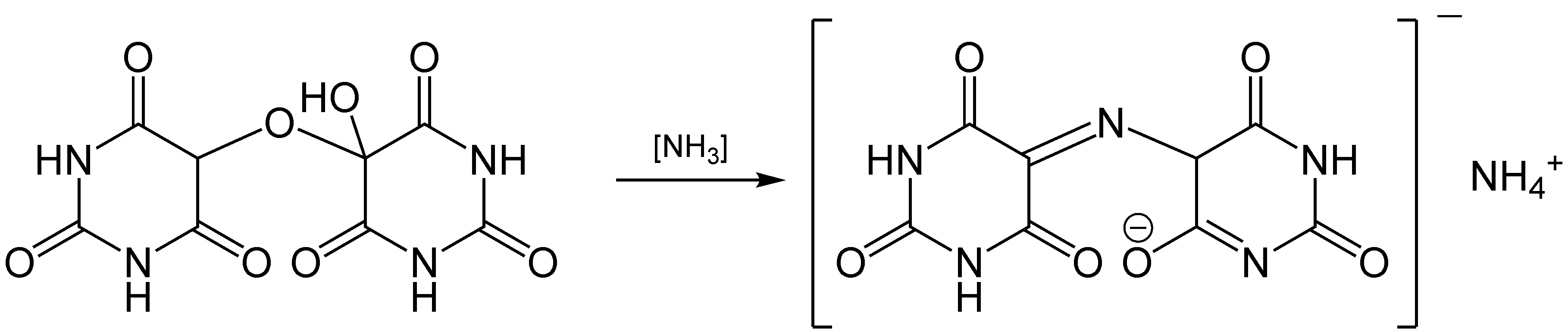
Murexide dye (right) from reaction of alloxantin (left)

Scheele sourced uric acid from human calculi (such as kidney stones) and called the compound lithic acid. William Prout investigated the compound in 1818, and he used boa constrictor excrement with up to 90% ammonium acid urate.

In the chapter "Nitrogen" of his memoir The Periodic Table, Primo Levi tells of his futile attempt to make alloxan for a cosmetics manufacturer who has read that it can cause permanent reddening of the lips. Levi considers the droppings of pythons as a source for uric acid for making alloxan, but he is turned down by the director of the Turin zoo because the zoo already has lucrative contracts with pharmaceutical companies, so he is obliged to use chickens as his source of uric acid. The synthesis fails, however, "and the alloxan and its resonant name remained a resonant name."

== Synthesis ==
It was originally obtained by oxidation of uric acid by nitric acid. It is prepared by oxidation of barbituric acid by chromium trioxide.

== Reactions ==
=== Hydrolysis ===
Alloxan is highly unstable in aqueous solution, undergoing hydrolysis to alloxanic acid. Under physiological conditions, alloxan has an estimated half-life of 1.5 minutes.

=== Reduction ===
Alloxan may be reduced to dialuric acid, which has a reductone structure, similar to ascorbic acid (Vitamin C). However, unlike ascorbic acid, alloxan and dialuric acid have strong pro-oxidant physiological effects.

A dimeric derivative alloxantin can be prepared by partial reduction of alloxan with hydrogen sulfide.

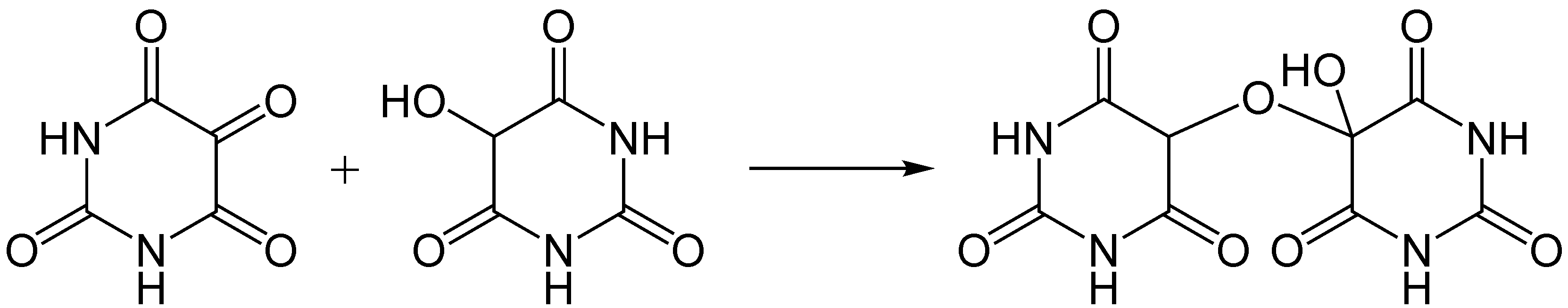
Alloxane (left) with dialuric acid (center) and alloxantin (right)

Alloxan monohydrate also undergoes one-electron reduction to form yellow salts containing a stable radical anion:

2 C_{4}H_{4}N_{2}O_{5} + 2 KCN → 2 [K^{+}][C_{4}H_{2}N_{2}O_{4}^{•}^{−}] + (CN)_{2} + 2 H_{2}O

== Biological effects ==
Alloxan is a toxic glucose analogue, which selectively destroys insulin-producing cells in the pancreas (that is, beta cells) when administered to rodents and many other animal species. This causes an insulin-dependent diabetes mellitus (called "alloxan diabetes") in these animals, with characteristics similar to type 1 diabetes in humans. Alloxan is selectively toxic to insulin-producing pancreatic beta cells because it preferentially accumulates in beta cells through uptake via the GLUT2 glucose transporter. Studies suggest alloxan does not cause diabetes in humans. Others found a significant difference in alloxan plasma levels in children with and without type 1 diabetes.

=== Reactive oxygen species generation ===
Alloxan (C_{4}H_{2}N_{2}O_{4}) readily undergoes redox cycling with its one-electron (C_{4}H_{3}N_{2}O_{4}^{•} semiquinone) and two-electron (dialuric acid, C_{4}H_{4}N_{2}O_{4}) reduction products. In the presence of intracellular reductants such as glutathione (or other thiols), this leads to the generation of toxic reactive oxygen species (ROS) via the interaction of alloxan reduction products with molecular oxygen and related species:

C_{4}H_{2}N_{2}O_{4} + GSH → C_{4}H_{3}N_{2}O_{4}^{•} + GS^{•}
C_{4}H_{3}N_{2}O_{4}^{•} + GSH → C_{4}H_{4}N_{2}O_{4} + GS^{•}
C_{4}H_{4}N_{2}O_{4} + O_{2} → C_{4}H_{3}N_{2}O_{4}^{•} + O_{2}^{•}^{−} + H^{+}
C_{4}H_{3}N_{2}O_{4}^{•} + O_{2} → C_{4}H_{2}N_{2}O_{4} + O_{2}^{•}^{−} + H^{+}

=== Impact upon beta cells ===
Because it selectively kills the insulin-producing beta-cells found in the pancreas, alloxan is used to induce diabetes in laboratory animals. This occurs most likely because of selective uptake of the compound due to its structural similarity to glucose as well as the beta-cell's highly efficient uptake mechanism (GLUT2). In addition, alloxan has a high affinity to SH-containing cellular compounds and, as a result, reduces glutathione content. Furthermore, alloxan inhibits glucokinase, a SH-containing protein essential for insulin secretion induced by glucose.

Most studies have shown that alloxan is not toxic to the human beta-cell, even in very high doses, probably because of differing glucose uptake mechanisms in humans and rodents.

Alloxan is, however, toxic to the liver and the kidneys in high doses, as these are tissues where the GLUT2 transporter is expressed in humans.

== See also ==
- Streptozotocin
