= Dragendorff's reagent =

Color reagent to detect alkaloids

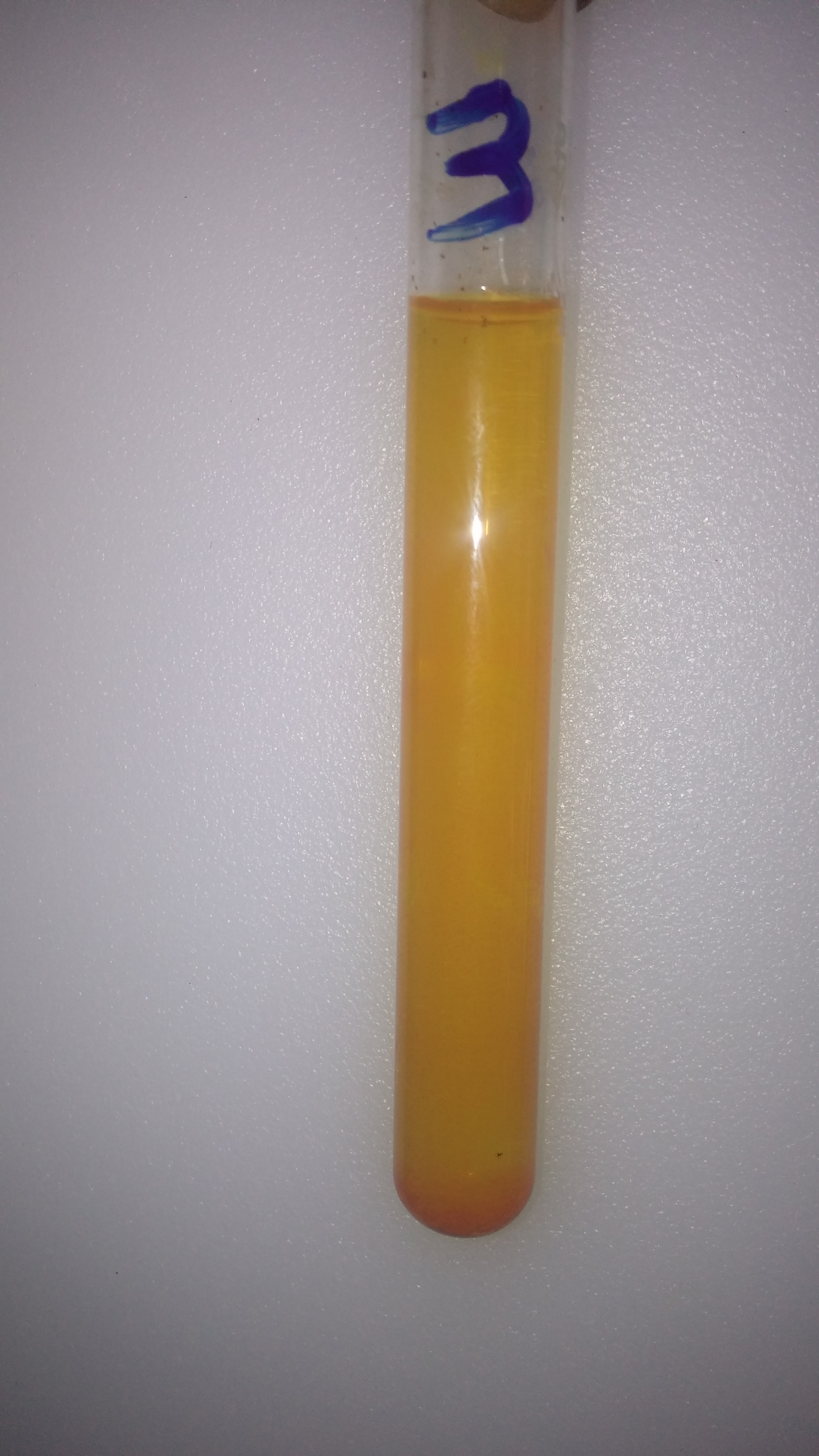
Reaction between alkaloid extract from Capparis spinosa L and Dragendorff’s reagent

Dragendorff's reagent is a color reagent to detect alkaloids in a test sample or as a stain for chromatography plates. Alkaloids, if present in the solution of sample, will react with Dragendorff's reagent and produce an orange or orange-red precipitate. Dragendorff's reagent does not detect all alkaloids. For example, caffeine and other purine alkaloids do not form precipitates with this reagent. This reagent was invented by the German pharmacologist, Johann Georg Dragendorff (1836–1898) at the Imperial University of Dorpat.

== Preparation ==
Dragendorff's reagent is prepared by mixing a concentrated solution of potassium iodide with a solution of bismuth subnitrate in a diluted acid (acetic acid or tartaric acid, hydrochloric acid or sulfuric acid is rarely being used) as a low pH is mandatory for this reagent.

The formation is as follows:

The black precipitate of bismuth iodide is formed from the reaction of bismuth ion and potassium iodide.

Bi^{3+} + 3 KI → BiI_{3} + 3 K^{+}

Then, the reaction between bismuth ion and excess potassium iodide will produce a soluble complex of potassium tetraiodobismuthate which has an orange color.

BiI_{3} + KI → K(BiI_{4})

Many compositions degrade over time and are sensitive to light, so for long-term storage it is often prepared as two separate solutions to be mixed before use, one containing bismuth subnitrate and acid with the other containing potassium iodide.

The most common composition is as follows:

Part A: 0.85g bismuth subnitrate, 40mL water, and 10mL glacial acetic acid.

Part B: 8g potassium iodide and 20mL water.

There are many different compositions in literature for the combined reagent. Some combine the entire volume of both solutions without dilution, but most involve diluting equal parts of these solutions with acid and water. One common composition is 5mL each of part A & B with 20mL of glacial acetic acid and 70-100mL of water.

== Reaction ==
Most of the alkaloids have a tertiary amine group, so the explanation for color reaction could be the following:

R_{3}N + HX → [R_{3}NH]^{+} + X^{−}
(X^{−} = anions of acid)

Then the insoluble complex salt is formed from the reaction between ammonium salt and potassium tetraiodobismuthate.

[R_{3}NH]^{+}X^{−} + K[BiI_{4}] → [R_{3}NH]^{+}[BiI_{4}]^{−} + KX

This ion pair has different colors: yellow, orange, red, and brown, which depend on the nature of alkaloids.
