= Murexide =

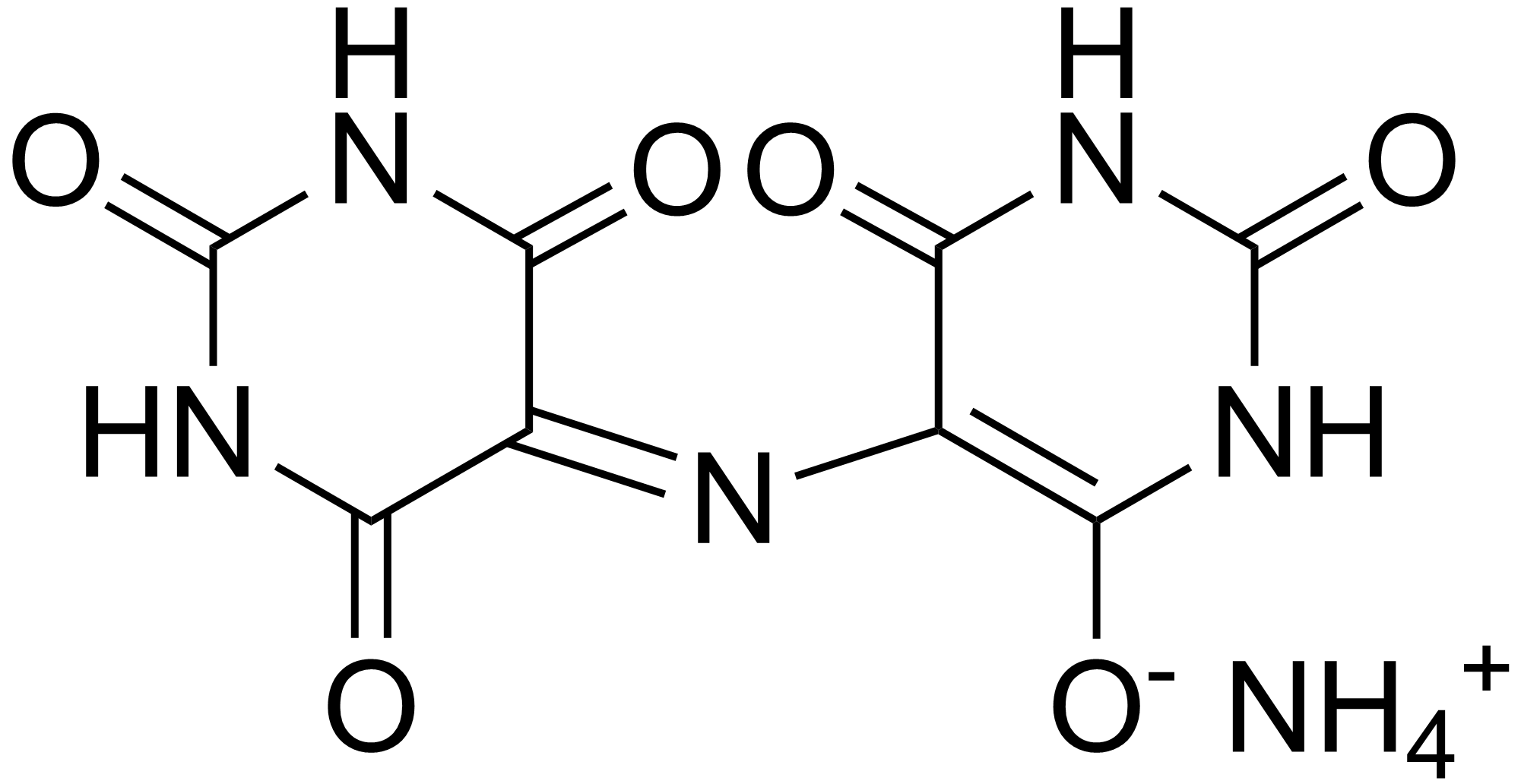

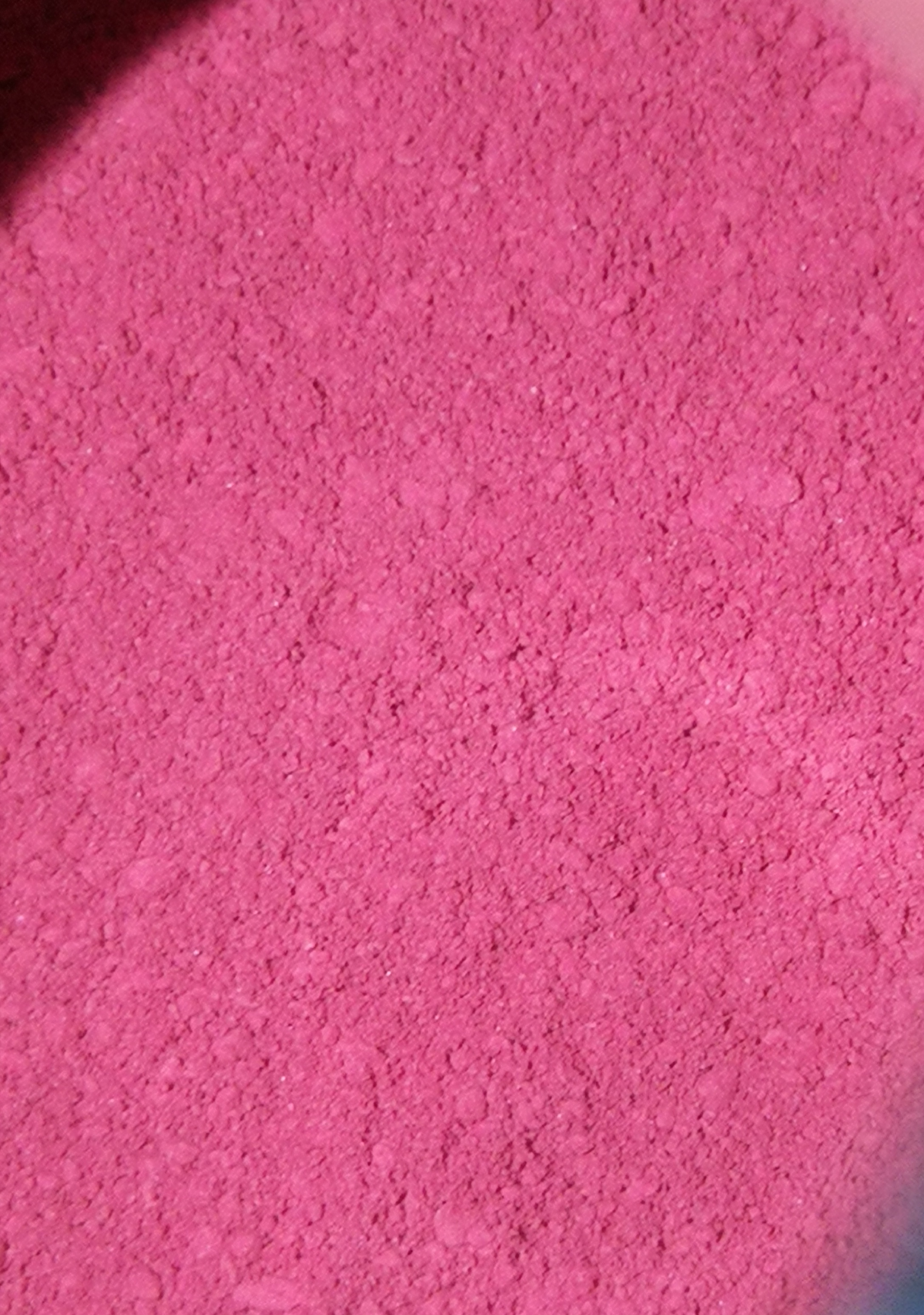

Names
- IUPAC name Ammonium 2,6-dioxo-5-[(2,4,6-trioxo-5-hexahydropyrimidinylidene)amino]-3H-pyrimidin-4-olate
- Other names Purpuric acid ammonium salt

Identifiers
CAS Number	3051-09-0; 6032-80-0 (hydrate)
3D model (JSmol)	Interactive image
ChemSpider	17264
ECHA InfoCard	100.019.334
EC Number	221-266-6
PubChem CID	18275
UNII	4W6L62S876; 221FEY2154 (hydrate)
CompTox Dashboard (EPA)	DTXSID40889371
- InChI: InChI=1S/C8H5N5O6.H3N/c14-3-1(4(15)11-7(18)10-3)9-2-5(16)12-8(19)13-6(2)17;/h(H2,10,11,14,15,18)(H3,12,13,16,17,19);1H3 Key: LJYRLGOJYKPILZ-UHFFFAOYSA-N; InChI=1/C8H5N5O6.H3N/c14-3-1(4(15)11-7(18)10-3)9-2-5(16)12-8(19)13-6(2)17;/h(H2,10,11,14,15,18)(H3,12,13,16,17,19);1H3 Key: LJYRLGOJYKPILZ-UHFFFAOYAL
- SMILES: [O-]\C2=C(/N=C1\C(=O)NC(=O)NC1=O)C(=O)NC(=O)N2.[NH4+]

Properties
Chemical formula	C_{8}H_{8}N_{6}O_{6}
Molar mass	284.188 g·mol^{−1}
Density	1.72 g/cm^{3} (hydrate of ammonium salt)
- Except where otherwise noted, data are given for materials in their standard state (at 25 °C [77 °F], 100 kPa). verify (what is ?) Infobox references

Murexide (NH_{4}C_{8}H_{4}N_{5}O_{6}, or C_{8}H_{5}N_{5}O_{6}·NH_{3}), also called ammonium purpurate or MX, is the ammonium salt of purpuric acid. It is a purple solid that is soluble in water. The compound was once used as an indicator reagent. Aqueous solutions are yellow at low pH, reddish-purple in weakly acidic solutions, and blue-purple in alkaline solutions.

== Preparation ==
Murexide is prepared by treating alloxantin with ammonia to 100 °C, or by treating uramil (5-aminobarbituric acid) with mercury oxide. It may also be prepared by digesting alloxan with alcoholic ammonia.

== History ==
Justus von Liebig and Friedrich Wöhler in Giessen, Germany, had investigated the purple product, murexide, obtained from snake excrement in the 1830s, but this was not an abundant raw material, and a method of using it as a dyestuff was not established at that time. In the 1850s, French colourists and dye-producers, such as Depoully in Paris, succeeded in making murexide from abundant South American guano and of applying it to natural fibres. It was then widely adopted in Britain, France and Germany.

== Use ==
Murexide is used in analytical chemistry as a complexometric indicator for complexometric titrations, most often of calcium ions, but also for copper, nickel, cobalt, thorium and rare-earth metals. It functions as a tridentate ligand.

Its use has been eclipsed by calcium-ion selective electrodes.
