= Fast Sulphon Black F =

Names
- IUPAC name 1-hydroxy-8-(2-hydroxy-1-naphthylazo)-2-(4-sulfo-1-naphthylazo)-naphthalene-3,6-disulfonic acid
- Other names Fast Sulphon Black

Identifiers
CAS Number	3682-47-1
3D model (JSmol)	Interactive image; Na salt: Interactive image
ChemSpider	21542668
ECHA InfoCard	100.020.879
EC Number	222-966-4
PubChem CID	407699; Na salt: 2733870
- InChI: InChI=1S/C30H20N4O11S3/c35-24-11-9-16-5-1-2-6-19(16)28(24)33-32-23-15-18(46(37,38)39)13-17-14-26(48(43,44)45)29(30(36)27(17)23)34-31-22-10-12-25(47(40,41)42)21-8-4-3-7-20(21)22/h1-15,35-36H,(H,37,38,39)(H,40,41,42)(H,43,44,45) Key: WQWKYALNLSYERE-UHFFFAOYSA-N
- SMILES: c1ccc2c(c1)ccc(c2/N=N/c3cc(cc4c3c(c(c(c4)S(=O)(=O)O)/N=N/c5ccc(c6c5cccc6)S(=O)(=O)O)O)S(=O)(=O)O)O; Na salt: C1=CC=C2C(=C1)C=CC(=C2N=NC3=C4C(=CC(=C3)S(=O)(=O)[O-])C=C(C(=C4O)N=NC5=CC=C(C6=CC=CC=C65)S(=O)(=O)[O-])S(=O)(=O)[O-])O.[Na+].[Na+].[Na+]

Properties
Chemical formula	C_{30}H_{20}N_{4}O_{11}S_{3}
Molar mass	708.695
- Except where otherwise noted, data are given for materials in their standard state (at 25 °C [77 °F], 100 kPa). verify (what is ?) Infobox references

Fast Sulphon Black F is a complexometric indicator used with EDTA, almost exclusively used in copper complexation determination.

== Application ==
Fast Sulphon Black is purple when complexed with copper, and turns green when titrated against EDTA, as the EDTA displaces it, being the better complexing agent due to the chelate effect.
