= Xylenol orange =

Names
- Preferred IUPAC name 2,2′,2′′,2′′′-{(1,1-Dioxo-2,1λ^{6}-benzoxathiole-3,3(1H)-diyl)bis[(6-hydroxy-5-methyl-3,1-phenylene)methylenenitrilo]}tetraacetic acid
- Other names XO

Identifiers
CAS Number	1611-35-4; 3618-43-7 (tetrasodium salt)
3D model (JSmol)	Interactive image
ChemSpider	65838
ECHA InfoCard	100.015.049
EC Number	216-553-8
PubChem CID	73041
UNII	S2VDY878QD; 0549U815B1 (tetrasodium salt)
CompTox Dashboard (EPA)	DTXSID1061819
- InChI: InChI=1S/C31H32N2O13S/c1-17-7-21(9-19(29(17)42)11-32(13-25(34)35)14-26(36)37)31(23-5-3-4-6-24(23)47(44,45)46-31)22-8-18(2)30(43)20(10-22)12-33(15-27(38)39)16-28(40)41/h3-10,42-43H,11-16H2,1-2H3,(H,34,35)(H,36,37)(H,38,39)(H,40,41) Key: ORZHVTYKPFFVMG-UHFFFAOYSA-N
- SMILES: O=C(O)CN(CC(=O)O)Cc1c(O)c(cc(c1)C3(OS(=O)(=O)c2ccccc23)c4cc(c(O)c(c4)CN(CC(=O)O)CC(=O)O)C)C

Properties
Chemical formula	C_{31}H_{32}N_{2}O_{13}S
Molar mass	672.66 g·mol^{−1}
Melting point	195 °C (383 °F; 468 K)
Solubility in water	200 mg/mL

Hazards
- GHS labelling
Pictograms	(GHS07: Exclamation mark)
Signal word	Warning
Hazard statements	H315, H319, H335
Precautionary statements	P261, P264, P271, P280, P302+P352, P304+P340, P305+P351+P338, P312, P321, P332+P313, P337+P313, P362, P403+P233, P405, P501
NFPA 704 (fire diamond)	2 1 2
Flash point	> 93 °C (199 °F; 366 K)
- Except where otherwise noted, data are given for materials in their standard state (at 25 °C [77 °F], 100 kPa). verify (what is ?) Infobox references

Xylenol orange is an organic reagent, most commonly used as a tetrasodium salt as an indicator for metal titrations. When used for metal titrations, it will appear red in the titrand and become yellow once it reaches its endpoint. Historically, commercial preparations of it have been notoriously impure, sometimes consisting of as little as 20% xylenol orange, and containing large amounts of semi-xylenol orange and iminodiacetic acid. Purities as high as 90% are now available.

It is fluorescent, and has excitation maximums of 440 & 570 nm and an emission maximum of 610 nm.
