= Complexometric titration =

Used to determine total hardness of water

Complexometric titration (sometimes chelatometry) is a form of volumetric analysis in which the formation of a colored complex is used to indicate the end point of a titration. Complexometric titrations are particularly useful for the determination of a mixture of different metal ions in solution. An indicator capable of producing an unambiguous color change is usually used to detect the end-point of the titration. Complexometric titrations are those reactions where a simple ion is transformed into a complex ion and the equivalence point is determined by using metal indicators or electrometrically.

== Principle ==
Most of the cations have the ability to form complexes with different molecules (or ions). In these complexes, the molecule that the cations bonded to donated electrons to the cation (cation becomes a Lewis acid), and forms a dative covalent bond. This type of bond is known as a Coordinate bond. In this type of bond, the molecule (or ion) that donates electrons provides both electrons needed to form the bond. These molecules (or ions) are known as ligands. The coordination number of the cation determines how many ligands it bonds with. This principle can be used in a titration to quantitatively analyze the concentration of complex-forming cations in a solution.

== Reactions used ==
In theory, any complexation reaction can be used as a volumetric technique provided that:

1. The reaction reaches equilibrium rapidly after each portion of titrant is added.
2. Interfering situations do not arise. For instance, the stepwise formation of several different complexes of the metal ion with the titrant, resulting in the presence of more than one complex in solution during the titration process.
3. A complexometric indicator capable of locating equivalence point with fair accuracy is available.

In practice, the use of EDTA as a titrant is well established.

== Use of EDTA ==
EDTA, ethylenediaminetetraacetic acid, has four carboxyl groups and two amine groups that can act as electron pair donors, or Lewis bases. The ability of EDTA to potentially donate its six lone pairs of electrons for the formation of coordinate covalent bonds to metal cations makes EDTA a hexadentate ligand. However, in practice EDTA is usually only partially ionized, and thus forms fewer than six coordinate covalent bonds with metal cations.

Disodium EDTA is commonly used to standardize aqueous solutions of transition metal cations. Disodium EDTA (often written as Na_{2}H_{2}Y) only forms four coordinate covalent bonds to metal cations at pH values ≤ 12. In this pH range, the amine groups remain protonated and thus unable to donate electrons to the formation of coordinate covalent bonds. Note that the shorthand form Na_{4−x}H_{x}Y can be used to represent any species of EDTA, with x designating the number of acidic protons bonded to the EDTA molecule.

EDTA forms an octahedral complex with most 2+ metal cations, M^{2+}, in aqueous solution. The main reason that EDTA is used so extensively in the standardization of metal cation solutions is that the formation constant for most metal cation-EDTA complexes is very high, meaning that the equilibrium for the reaction:

M^{2+} + H_{4}Y → MH_{2}Y + 2H^{+}

lies far to the right. Carrying out the reaction in a basic buffer solution removes H^{+} as it is formed, which also favors the formation of the EDTA-metal cation complex reaction product. For most purposes it can be considered that the formation of the metal cation-EDTA complex goes to completion, and this is chiefly why EDTA is used in titrations and standardizations of this type.

=== Data processing and calculation ===
First step is to plot the absorbance(A) values of standard solution against molar concentrations (c) of the known solution. Then the best straight line is plotted, passing through the origin. The experimental points are plotted as per Beer’s law:

A= E*c*l where E= molar extinction coefficient and l= optical path length usually 1 cm.

Second step is to measure absorbance (A’) of unknown solution and match it with the known absorbance-concentration plot of the standard solution. Thereby calculating the molar concentration of the unknown solution. This is calculated by using the formula, concentration of unknown =A’/(E*l). This can also be calculated using this given relation,

concentration of unknown/ concentration of known = A’/A.

=== Indicators ===
To carry out metal cation titrations using EDTA, it is almost always necessary to use a complexometric indicator to determine when the end point has been reached. Common indicators are organic dyes such as Fast Sulphon Black, Eriochrome Black T, Eriochrome Red B, Patton Reeder, or Murexide. Color change shows that the indicator has been displaced (usually by EDTA) from the metal cations in solution when the end point has been reached. Thus, the free indicator (rather than the metal complex) serves as the endpoint indicator.

== See also ==
- Titration
- Triethanolamine

== Bibliography ==
- “Spectroscopic Estimations “ G.N Mukherjee. Page 30
