= Acid red 13 =

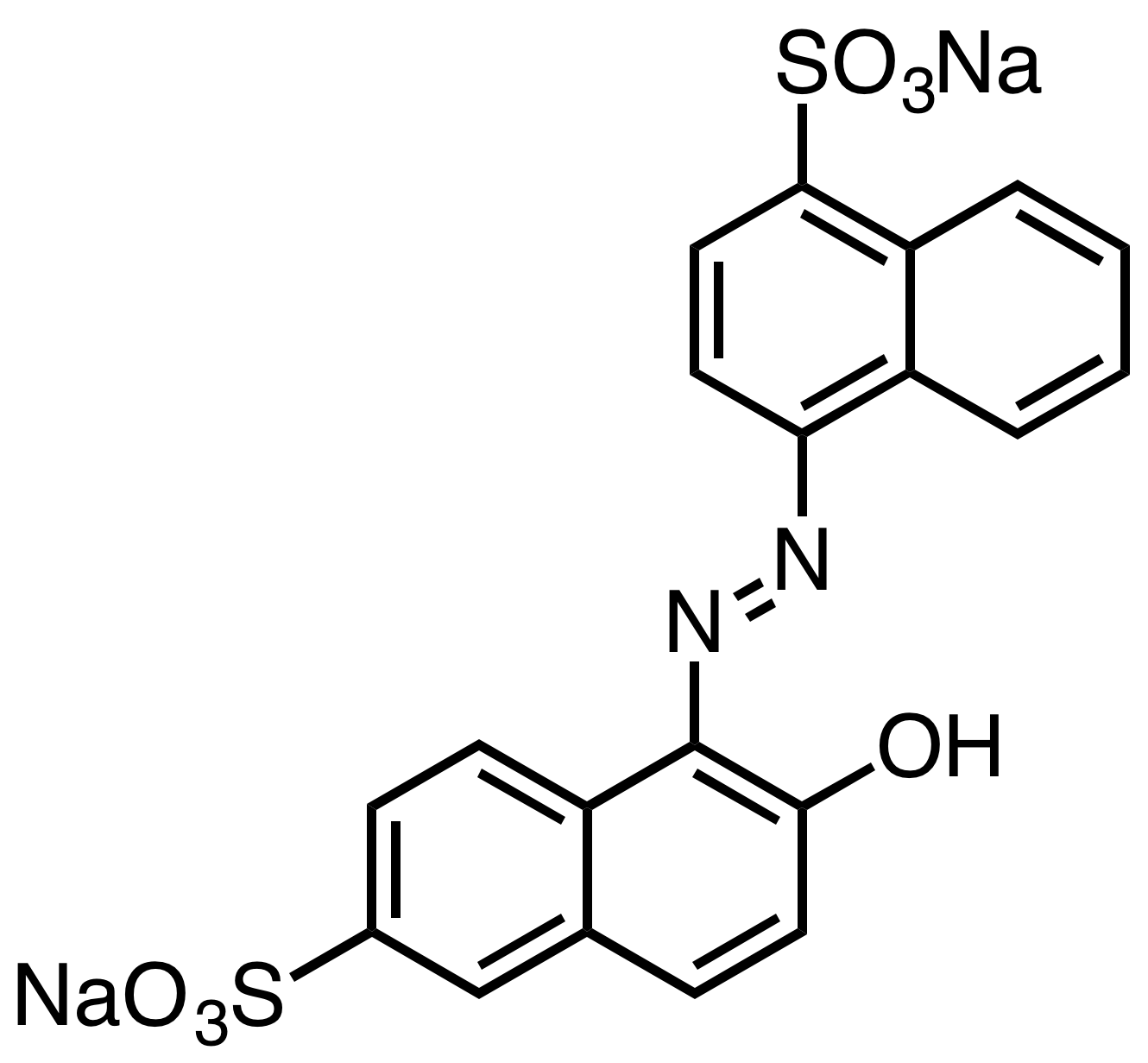

Identifiers
CAS Number	2302-96-7
3D model (JSmol)	Interactive image
EC Number	218-958-5
PubChem CID	9570106
UNII	5926AP228X
- InChI: InChI=1S/C20H14N2O7S2.2Na/c23-18-9-5-12-11-13(30(24,25)26)6-7-14(12)20(18)22-21-17-8-10-19(31(27,28)29)16-4-2-1-3-15(16)17;;/h1-11,21H,(H,24,25,26)(H,27,28,29);;/q;2*+1/p-2/b22-20-;; Key: XYTVLRKJXNXOOI-CAPIVQQTSA-L
- SMILES: C1=CC=C2C(=C1)C(=CC=C2S(=O)(=O)[O-])NN=C3C4=C(C=CC3=O)C=C(C=C4)S(=O)(=O)[O-].[Na+].[Na+]

Properties
Chemical formula	C_{20}H_{12}N_{2}Na_{2}O_{7}S_{2}
Molar mass	502.42 g·mol^{−1}
Appearance	red solid
- Except where otherwise noted, data are given for materials in their standard state (at 25 °C [77 °F], 100 kPa). Infobox references

Acid Red 13 is an azo dye. It is produced as a sodium salt. Solid samples appear dark red.
