= Piezochromism =

ROY, a molecule that displays piezochromism.

Piezochromism, from the Greek piezô "to squeeze, to press" and chromos "color", describes the tendency of certain materials to change color with the application of pressure. This effect is closely related to the electronic band gap change, which can be found in plastics, semiconductors (e.g. hybrid perovskites) and hydrocarbons. One simple molecule displaying this property is 5-methyl-2-[(2-nitrophenyl)amino]-3-thiophenecarbonitrile, also known as ROY owing to its red, orange and yellow crystalline forms. Individual yellow and pale orange versions transform reversibly to red at high pressure.
