= Acid dye =

Dye applied to low pH textile

Acid red 88 is an acid dye used to produce red woolen yarns.

An acid dye is an anionic dye used especially to colour protein fibres such as wool and silk, as well as the synthetic fibre nylon, commonly from an acidic dye bath. Acid dyes attach to fibres through ionic bonding, hydrogen bonding, and van der Waals forces. They are classified according to their dyeing behaviour, particularly their wet fastness, migration ability, and dyeing pH, into leveling, milling, and metal-complex acid dyes.

Acid dyes have diverse chemical structures; important groups include azo dyes, anthraquinone dyes, and triarylmethane dyes. In addition to textile dyeing, acid dyes are used in histology to stain positively charged tissue components, including cytoplasm, collagen, and mitochondria, and some are used as food colourants.

== Description ==
Acid dyes are generally divided into three classes according to their fastness requirements, migration ability, and dyeing pH.

Acid dyes affix to fibers by hydrogen bonding, Van der Waals forces and ionic bonding. While some acid dyes work in water, many choose to activate dyes in acid dye-baths instead. According to the Brønsted–Lowry acid–base theory, an acid is a molecule or ion capable of donating a proton, and this is determined by the acid dissociation constant. Compared to most acids, water has a much higher pKa value, meaning that it dissociates to give H^{+} with more difficulty. In this context, if an acid is used instead of water, then the hydrogen ion (H^{+}) is more easily able to dissociate in order to react with the aniline dye anion, allowing the dye to dissolve.

Animal protein fibers and the synthetic fiber nylon contain many cationic sites that bind anionic dye. The strength (fastness) of this bond reflects the strength of this ionic interaction.

== Uses ==
=== Fibers ===
In the laboratory, home, or art studio, the acid used in the dye-bath is often vinegar (acetic acid) or citric acid. The uptake rate of the dye is controlled with the use of sodium chloride. In textiles, acid dyes are effective on protein fibers, i.e. animal hair fibers like wool, alpaca, and mohair. They are also effective on silk. They are effective in dyeing the synthetic fiber nylon, but of minimum interest in dyeing any other synthetic fibers.

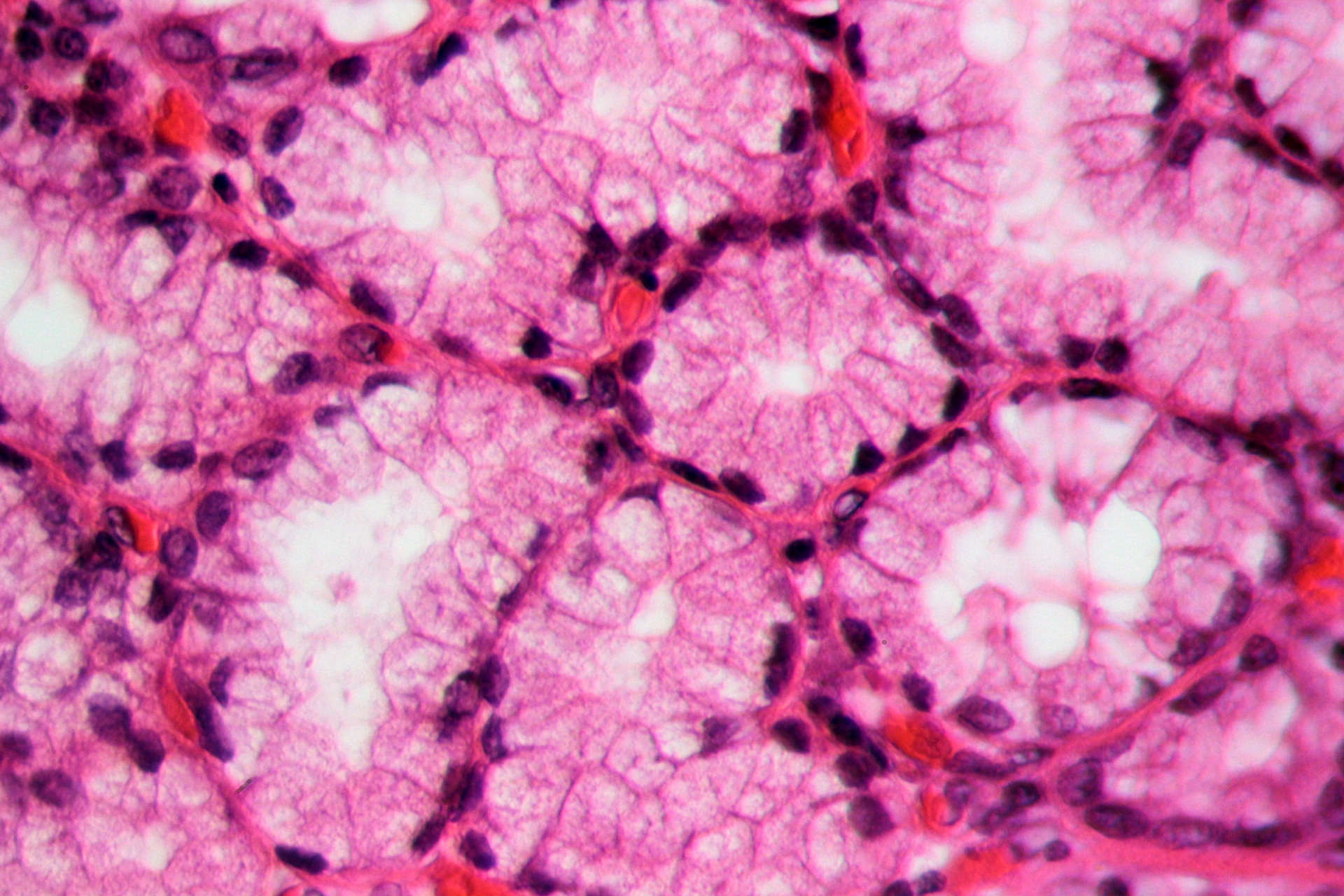
Lee's stain used in gallbladder cells.

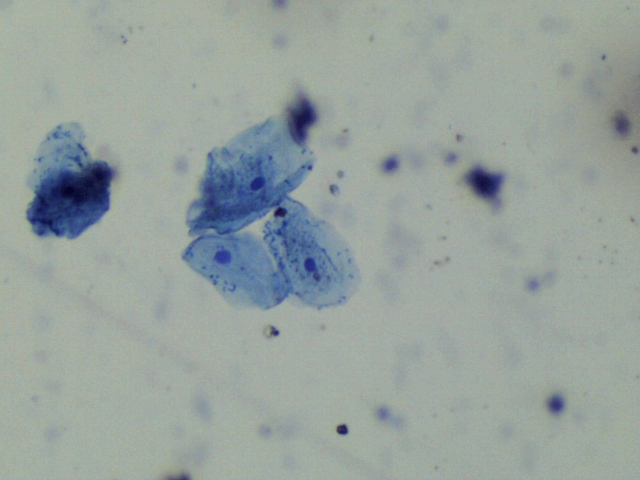
PTAH stain used in Human squamous epithelial cells.

=== Histology ===
In staining during microscopic examination for diagnosis or research, acid dyes are used to color basic tissue proteins. In contrast, basic dyes are used to stain cell nuclei and some other acidic components of tissues. Regarding cellular structures, acid dyes will stain acidophilic structures that have a net positive charge due to the fact that they have a negatively charged chromophore. Acidophilic structures include the cytoplasm, collagen and mitochondria. The two have an affinity for each other due to the conflicting charges. Examples of acid dyes used in medicine include:

- Lee's stain (stains reddish-pink).
- Phosphotungstic Acid Hematoxylin (PTAH) stain (stains blue).
- Eosin stain (stains pinkish-orange).

=== Food Industry ===
Acid dyes can also be used as food colouring, helping to increase the attractiveness of certain foods, and thus becoming more appealing to customers. Some examples include erythrosine (red-pink), tartrazine (yellow), sunset yellow, and allura red, to name a few, many of which are azo dyes. These dyes can be used in frosting, cookies, bread, condiments or drinks. In order to prevent health hazards, a dye must be approved for consumption before it can be marked as edible. Some separation methods that can be used to identify unapproved dyes include the solid phase extraction process, the overpressured thin layer chromatography process, and the use of reversed-phase plates.

== Structures ==
The chemistry of acid dyes is complex and diverse. Most acid dyes are related in basic structure to the following:

- Anthraquinone type: Many acid dyes are synthesized from chemical intermediates that form anthraquinone-like structures as their final state. Many blue dyes have this structure as their basic shape. The structure predominates in the leveling class of acid dye.
- Azo dyes: The structure of azo dyes contains the azo group (R-N=N−R. Most azo dyes are not acid dyes, but many acid dyes are azo dyes. Many acid dyes of the azo type are red in color.
- Triarylmethane dye: These predominate in the milling class of dye. There are many yellow and green dyes commercially applied to fibers that are related to triphenylmethane.

C.I. Acid Black 1

C.I. Acid Yellow 36

C.I. Acid Blue 117

C.I. Acid Orange 19

C.I. Acid Blue 25

C.I. Acid Orange 3

== Classes of acid dyes ==
Acidic dyes can be classified according to their dyeing behavior. This includes their wet fastness, migration ability, and dyeing pH:

- Leveling acid dyes: These dyes have relatively low molecular weights. Consequently, they migrate more readily before fixation and they exhibit low wet fastness. They are not normally suited for use as apparel fabric. They require an acidic dye bath, often using sulfuric acid and sodium sulfate mixtures (pH2-4), together with leveling agents such as ethoxylated fatty amines.
- Milling dyes: These dyes are high molecule weight, with the result that migrates slowly. Consequently, they exhibit wet fastness, which is useful for dyeing wool materials. Milling acid dyes are sometimes called 'Neutral acid dyes' as they do not require an acidic dye bath. They are commonly applied using Acetic acid (pH4-7).
- Metal complex acid dyes: These dyes are composed of acid dye molecules complexed with a metal ion, which will usually be chromium or cobalt. Metal complex acid dyes have high molecular weights, giving them low mobility and high wet fastness. Due to this, they are commonly used on nylon and other synthetic polyamide fibers. Metal complex acid dyes are economical. However, they produce relatively dull shades. Metal complex acid dyes take a larger range of pH in the dyebath (pH2-7).

== Safety ==
Some dyes are mutagenic and carcinogenic, including methyl orange, acid red 26, and trypan blue.
