= Chromotropic acid =

Chemical reagent used in colorimetric chemical analysis

- Skeletal formula

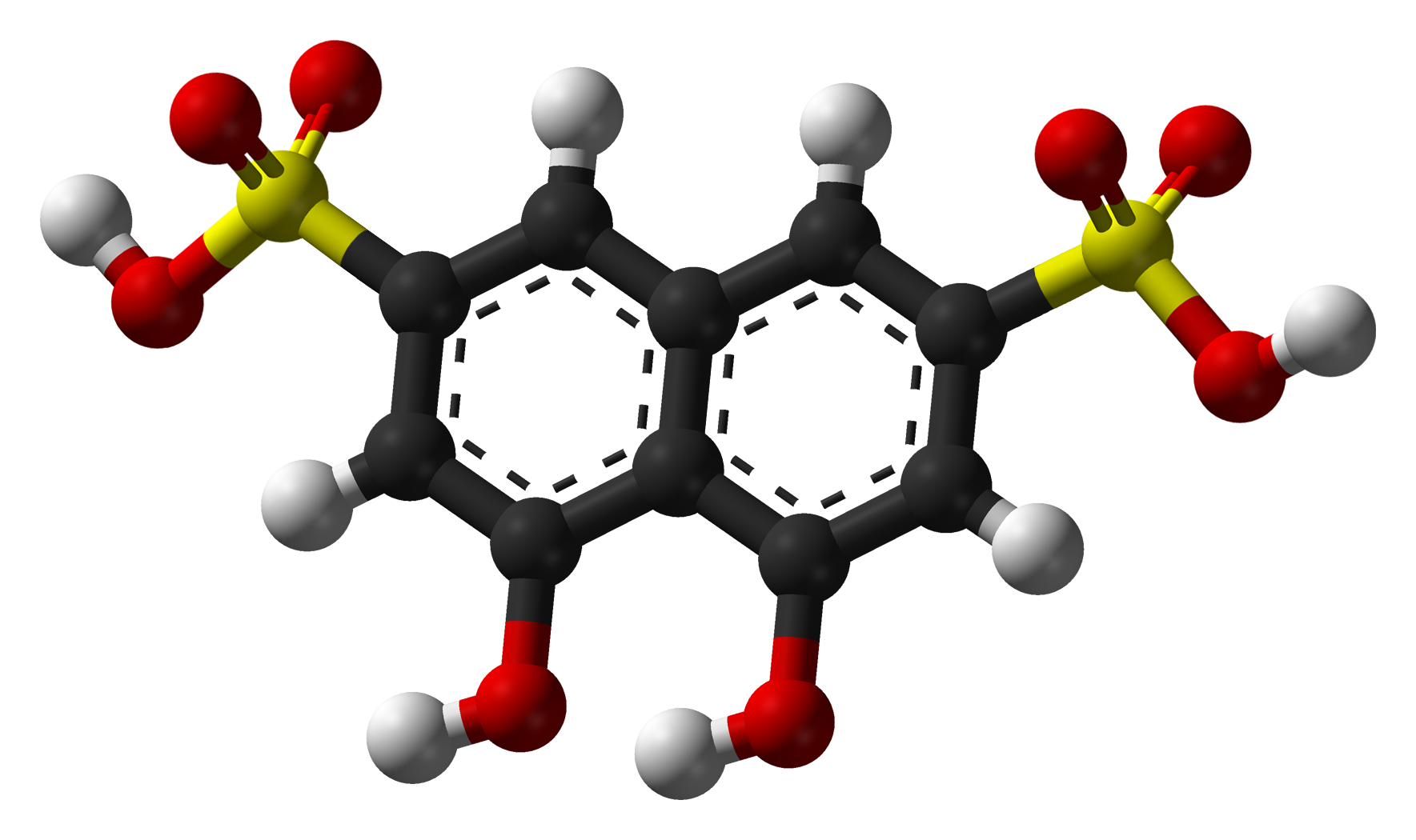
- Ball-and-stick model

Names
- Preferred IUPAC name 4,5-Dihydroxynaphthalene-2,7-disulfonic acid

Identifiers
CAS Number	148-25-4
3D model (JSmol)	Interactive image
Beilstein Reference	1827764
ChEBI	CHEBI:1751
ChEMBL	ChEMBL144298
ChemSpider	60557
ECHA InfoCard	100.005.194
KEGG	C11323
PubChem CID	67221
UNII	S596OD720M
CompTox Dashboard (EPA)	DTXSID6059732
- InChI: InChI=1S/C10H8O8S2/c11-8-3-6(19(13,14)15)1-5-2-7(20(16,17)18)4-9(12)10(5)8/h1-4,11-12H,(H,13,14,15)(H,16,17,18) Key: HLVXFWDLRHCZEI-UHFFFAOYSA-N; InChI=1/C10H8O8S2/c11-8-3-6(19(13,14)15)1-5-2-7(20(16,17)18)4-9(12)10(5)8/h1-4,11-12H,(H,13,14,15)(H,16,17,18) Key: HLVXFWDLRHCZEI-UHFFFAOYAH
- SMILES: O=S(=O)(O)c1cc(O)c2c(c1)cc(cc2O)S(=O)(=O)O

Properties
Chemical formula	C_{10}H_{8}O_{8}S_{2}
Molar mass	320.29 g·mol^{−1}
Acidity (pK_{a})	pK_{a1} = 5.36 pK_{a2} = 15.6

Hazards
- GHS labelling
Pictograms	(GHS07: Exclamation mark)
Signal word	Warning
Hazard statements	H315, H319, H335
Precautionary statements	P261, P264, P271, P280, P302+P352, P304+P340, P305+P351+P338, P312, P321, P332+P313, P337+P313, P362, P403+P233, P405, P501
- Except where otherwise noted, data are given for materials in their standard state (at 25 °C [77 °F], 100 kPa). verify (what is ?) Infobox references

Chromotropic acid is an organic compound with the chemical formula (HO)_{2}C_{10}H_{4}(SO_{3}H)_{2}. Its name is derived from the two ancient Greek words χρωμός (chromos, color) and τροπέιν or τρέπω (verb: tropein, trepo, changing, turning), meaning it changes of color when reacting with some other compounds. This property is put to use in analytical chemistry for the colorimetric assay of various compounds such as formaldehyde, nitrate anions and even some herbicides.

== Uses ==
Chromotropic acid is used for testing for the presence of formaldehyde. The usefulness of this reagent in quantitative determination is the formation of a red coloration (peaking at 580 nm wavelength) when chromotropic acid in 50% sulfuric acid reacts with formaldehyde. The coloration is specific to this aldehyde and is not produced from other organic species such as other aldehydes, ketones and carboxylic acids. The NIOSH Formaldehyde method #3500 is the reference analytical standard that uses chromotropic acid.

Chromotropic acid is also used for the direct spectrophotometric determination of nitrate anions according to a method developed by West and Lyles in 1960.

It can also be used as a reagent for the quantitative determination of the herbicide 2,4-dichlorophenoxyacetic acid (2,4-D).
