= Glutamate diacetate =

Identifiers
CAS Number	51981-21-6
3D model (JSmol)	Interactive image
ChemSpider	21161449
ECHA InfoCard	100.052.322
EC Number	257-573-7
PubChem CID	44630158
UNII	5EHL50I4MY
CompTox Dashboard (EPA)	DTXSID2052158
- InChI: InChI=1S/C9H13NO8.4Na/c11-6(12)2-1-5(9(17)18)10(3-7(13)14)4-8(15)16;;;;/h5H,1-4H2,(H,11,12)(H,13,14)(H,15,16)(H,17,18);;;;/q;4*+1/p-4/t5-;;;;/m0..../s1 Key: UZVUJVFQFNHRSY-OUTKXMMCSA-J
- SMILES: C(CC(=O)[O-])[C@@H](C(=O)[O-])N(CC(=O)[O-])CC(=O)[O-].[Na+].[Na+].[Na+].[Na+]

Properties
Chemical formula	C_{9}H_{9}NNa_{4}O_{8}
Molar mass	351.129 g·mol^{−1}
Appearance	white
Density	1.466 g·cm^{−3} (20 °C)
Solubility in water	highly soluble

Hazards
- GHS labelling
Pictograms	(GHS05: Corrosive) (GHS07: Exclamation mark)
Signal word	Warning
Hazard statements	H290, H319, H335
Precautionary statements	P234, P261, P264+P265, P271, P280, P304+P340, P305+P351+P338, P319, P337+P317, P390, P403+P233, P405, P501
- Except where otherwise noted, data are given for materials in their standard state (at 25 °C [77 °F], 100 kPa). Infobox references

Glutamate diacetate (GLDA) is an aminopolycarboxylate type tetradentate complexing agent that is based on glutamic acid. It is usually available as its sodium salt, tetrasodium glutamate diacetate. Glutamate diacetate is characterized by exceptionally high biodegradability and solubility. Glutamate diacetate is regarded as a “green” alternative to the widely used chelators ethylenediaminetetraacetic acid (EDTA) and nitrilotriacetic acid (NTA).

== Properties ==
Tetrasodium glutamate diacetate is a white, highly water-soluble, hygroscopic solid that forms alkaline (typically pH 11.5), slightly yellow aqueous solutions. Unlike EDTA and NTA, GLDA dissolves readily in aqueous media across a broad pH range from 1 to 12. Its thermal stability (decomposition >280 °C) is significantly higher than that of EDTA and NTA (>150 °C).

== Synthesis and preparation ==
The starting material for glutamate diacetate is L-glutamic acid, specifically monosodium glutamate (MSG), which is significantly more water-soluble and is produced in quantities exceeding 3 million metric tons per year as a flavor enhancer. To achieve acceptable yields, MSG is reacted at pH < 7 in a cyanomethylation reaction with aqueous formaldehyde and hydrogen cyanide to produce sodium glutamate diacetonitrile, a substituted iminodiacetonitrile.

Synthesis of tetrasodium glutamate diacetate by cyanomethylation

This diacetonitrile is hydrolyzed with sodium hydroxide to form the tetrasodium salt of L-glutamic acid-N,N-diacetic acid.

Using sodium cyanide instead of hydrocyanic acid simplifies the process. Yields are approximately 90%, with byproduct levels of nitrilotriacetic acid remaining well below 0.1% by weight. The reaction can be carried out either in a batch process or as a continuous process.

== Uses ==
Due to the (currently) accepted yet ultimately unsatisfactory ecological and toxicological profiles of the most common complexing agents—EDTA and NTA, which are derived from petrochemical raw materials—the search continues for more environmentally friendly alternatives. Alongside β-alanine acetic acid (β-ADA), methylglycine diacetic acid (MGDA), tetrasodium iminodisuccinate (IDHA), citric acid, and gluconic acid, glutamate diacetate was developed as a biodegradable complexing agent produced largely from renewable raw materials—in this case, L-glutamic acid. Glutamate diacetate is classified as readily biodegradable according to OECD Guidelines for the Testing of Chemicals OECD 301 D (>60% after 28 days).

The following table compares the complexation constant log K values of GLDA with the standards EDTA and NTA, as well as the biodegradable complexing agents methylglycindiacetic acid (MGDA) and tetrasodium iminodisuccinate (IDHA), against polyvalent metal ions:

Metal ions	GLDA	Ethylenediaminetetraacetic acid	Nitrilotriacetic acid	Methylglycindiacetic acid	Tetrasodium iminodisuccinate
Al^{3+}	12.2	16.4	11.4	-	14.1
Ba^{2+}	3.5	7.9	4.8	4.9	3.4
Ca^{2+}	5.9	10.7	6.4	7.0	5.2
Cd^{2+}	9.1	16.5	9.8	10.6	8.4
Co^{2+}	10.0	16.5	10.4	11.1	10.5
Cu^{2+}	13.1	18.8	13.0	13.9	13.1
Fe^{2+}	8.7	14.3	8.9	8.1	8.2
Fe^{3+}	11.7	25.1	15.9	16.5	15.2
Hg^{2+}	14.3	21.5	14.3	-	14.9
Mg^{2+}	5.2	8.8	5.5	5.8	6.1
Mn^{2+}	7.6	13.9	7.5	8.4	7.7
Ni^{2+}	10.9	18.4	11.5	12.0	12.2
Pb^{2+}	10.5	18.0	11.5	12.1	11.0
Sr^{2+}	4.1	8.7	5.0	5.2	4.1
Zn^{2+}	10.0	16.5	10.7	10.9	10.8

Compared to other chelating agents, EDTA exhibits significantly higher complex formation constants across all cations and therefore forms more stable complexes than GLDA. GLDA generally has slightly lower log K values with metal ions than NTA.

The most critical property of chelating agents is their ability to form complexes with calcium and magnesium ions, which are the primary cause of water hardness. Chelation of the hardness-forming Ca^{2+} ions with GLDA-Na_{4} prevents the precipitation of calcium carbonate, even at elevated temperatures, and promotes the dissolution of limescale deposits. Consequently, tetrasodium glutamate diacetate acts as a builder in detergents and cleaning agents by enhancing the emulsifying effect of surfactants.

Due to its excellent water solubility and stability even at high pH values, GLDA-Na_{4} is suitable as a substitute for sodium tripolyphosphate (STPP) in automatic dishwashing detergents and phosphate-free laundry detergents.

GLDA-Na_{4} increases the effectiveness of biocides by complexing Ca^{2+} and Mg^{2+} ions, which destabilizes microbial membranes and thereby increases their sensitivity to preservatives and biocides.

The complexing properties of glutamate diacetate are utilized in oil and gas production to dissolve deposits of strontium sulfate, barium sulfate, and calcium sulfate and to prevent the precipitation of sparingly soluble iron salts.

Complexes of trace elements with glutamate diacetate are used as micronutrients in fertilizers and as food and feed additives (dietary supplements).
