= BAPTA =

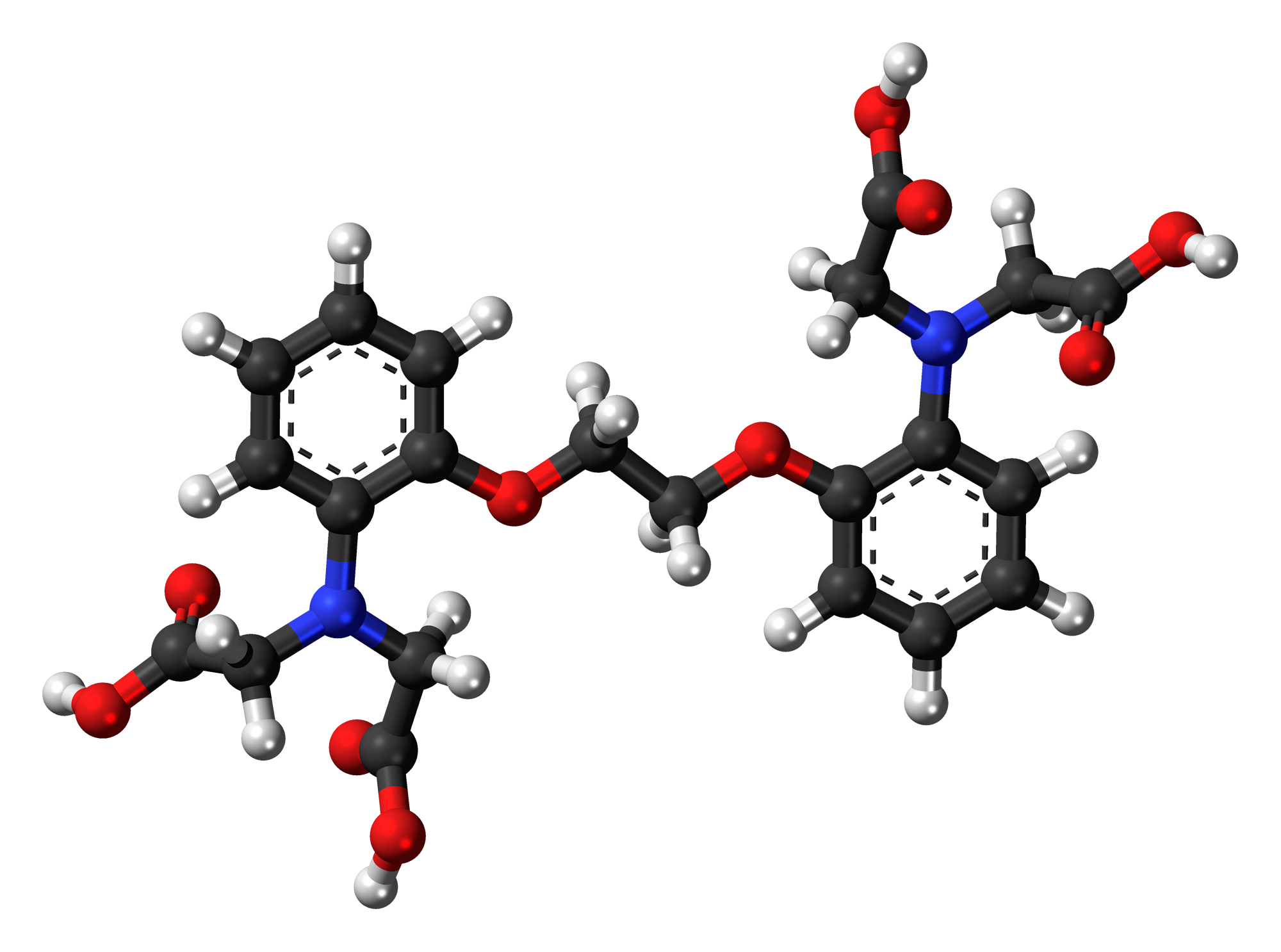

Names
- Preferred IUPAC name 2,2′,2′′,2′′′-[Ethane-1,2-diylbis(oxy-2,1-phenylenenitrilo)]tetraacetic acid

Identifiers
CAS Number	85233-19-8
3D model (JSmol)	Interactive image
ChEBI	CHEBI:60888
ChemSpider	94562
ECHA InfoCard	100.157.377
PubChem CID	104751
UNII	K22DDW77C0
CompTox Dashboard (EPA)	DTXSID30234432
- InChI: InChI=1S/C22H24N2O10/c25-19(26)11-23(12-20(27)28)15-5-1-3-7-17(15)33-9-10-34-18-8-4-2-6-16(18)24(13-21(29)30)14-22(31)32/h1-8H,9-14H2,(H,25,26)(H,27,28)(H,29,30)(H,31,32) Key: FTEDXVNDVHYDQW-UHFFFAOYSA-N; InChI=1/C22H24N2O10/c25-19(26)11-23(12-20(27)28)15-5-1-3-7-17(15)33-9-10-34-18-8-4-2-6-16(18)24(13-21(29)30)14-22(31)32/h1-8H,9-14H2,(H,25,26)(H,27,28)(H,29,30)(H,31,32) Key: FTEDXVNDVHYDQW-UHFFFAOYAD
- SMILES: O=C(O)CN(c2ccccc2OCCOc1ccccc1N(CC(=O)O)CC(=O)O)CC(=O)O

Properties
Chemical formula	C_{22}H_{24}N_{2}O_{10}
Molar mass	476.433
Density	1.494 g/cm^{3}
Melting point	177 to 179 °C (351 to 354 °F; 450 to 452 K)
- Except where otherwise noted, data are given for materials in their standard state (at 25 °C [77 °F], 100 kPa). verify (what is ?) Infobox references

BAPTA (1,2-bis(o-aminophenoxy)ethane-N,N,N′,N′-tetraacetic acid) is an aminopolycarboxylic acid with a high affinity for calcium. It is a white solid. It is used in research to chelate Ca^{2+}, as it behaves similarly to EGTA and EDTA.

== Complexation ==
BAPTA, as its conjugate base, binds calcium ions as a decadentate ligand:

[CH_{2}OC_{6}H_{4}N(CH_{2}CO_{2}H)_{2}]_{2} + Ca^{2+} → Ca[CH_{2}OC_{6}H_{4}N(CH_{2}CO_{2})_{2}]^{2−}_{2} + 4 H^{+}

According to X-ray crystallography. the four carboxylates, two amines, and two ether oxygens bind to Ca^{2+}.

There is a range of reported values for the dissociation constant of BAPTA, though 0.2 μM appears consistently. The rate constant for calcium binding is 500 μM^{−1} s^{−1}. The complexation process of calcium ion to BAPTA can be deconvoluted into three main processes: conformational changes of the glicol linker, nitrogen conjugation and electronic effects changes of the benzene rings.

BAPTA is a component of some fluorescent calcium ion indicators such as Fluo-4, Calcium Green and Oregon Green 488 BAPTA-1 and -2 (OGB-1, OGB2). These indicators change their fluorescence intensity and fluorescence lifetime depending on the calcium ion concentration.

== See also ==
- EDTA
- EGTA
- Fura-2
