= C10H16N2O8 =

The molecular formula C_{10}H_{16}N_{2}O_{8} (molar mass: 292.24 g/mol, exact mass: 292.0907 u) may refer to:

- EDDS
- Ethylenediaminetetraacetic acid
