= EGTA =

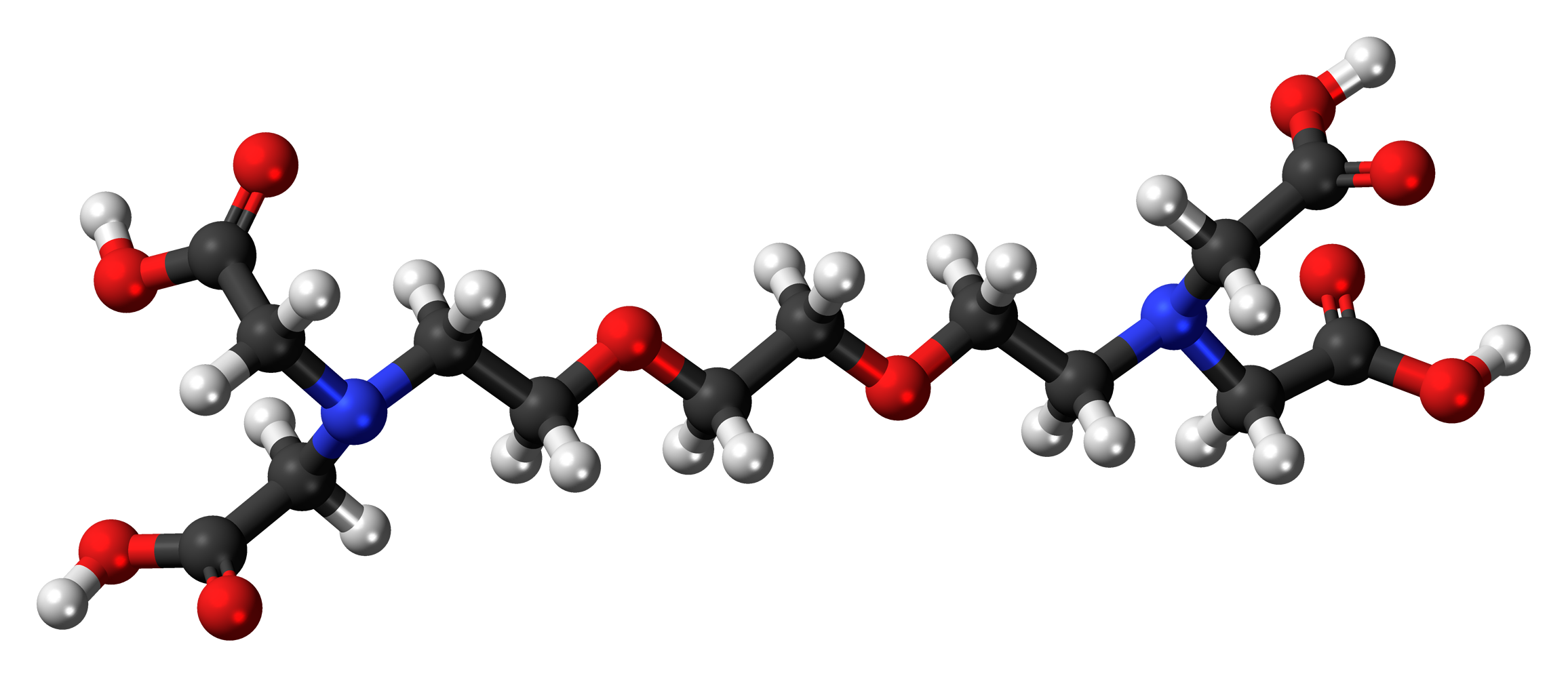

Names
- Preferred IUPAC name 3,12-Bis(carboxymethyl)-6,9-dioxa-3,12-diazatetradecane-1,14-dioic acid
- Other names Triethylene glycol diamine tetraacetic acid

Identifiers
CAS Number	67-42-5 (free acid); 13368-13-3 (tetrasodium salt)
3D model (JSmol)	Interactive image
ChEBI	CHEBI:30740
ChEMBL	ChEMBL240390
ChemSpider	5972
ECHA InfoCard	100.000.592
KEGG	D00569
PubChem CID	6207
UNII	526U7A2651
CompTox Dashboard (EPA)	DTXSID2045151
- InChI: InChI=1S/C14H24N2O10/c17-11(18)7-15(8-12(19)20)1-3-25-5-6-26-4-2-16(9-13(21)22)10-14(23)24/h1-10H2,(H,17,18)(H,19,20)(H,21,22)(H,23,24) Key: DEFVIWRASFVYLL-UHFFFAOYSA-N; InChI=1/C10H13NO2/c1-3-13-10-6-4-9(5-7-10)11-8(2)12/h4-7H,3H2,1-2H3,(H,11,12) Key: CPJSUEIXXCENMM-UHFFFAOYAO; InChI=1/C14H24N2O10/c17-11(18)7-15(8-12(19)20)1-3-25-5-6-26-4-2-16(9-13(21)22)10-14(23)24/h1-10H2,(H,17,18)(H,19,20)(H,21,22)(H,23,24) Key: DEFVIWRASFVYLL-UHFFFAOYAF
- SMILES: O=C(O)CN(CC(=O)O)CCOCCOCCN(CC(=O)O)CC(=O)O

Properties
Chemical formula	C_{14}H_{24}N_{2}O_{10}
Molar mass	380.350 g·mol^{−1}
Melting point	241 °C (466 °F; 514 K)
Acidity (pK_{a})	2.0, 2.68, 8.85, 9.43
- Except where otherwise noted, data are given for materials in their standard state (at 25 °C [77 °F], 100 kPa). verify (what is ?) Infobox references

EGTA (ethylene glycol-bis(β-aminoethyl ether)-N,N,N′,N′-tetraacetic acid), also known as egtazic acid (INN, USAN), is an aminopolycarboxylic acid, a chelating agent. It is a white solid that is related to the better known EDTA. Compared to EDTA, it has a lower affinity for magnesium, making it more selective for calcium ions. It is useful in buffer solutions that resemble the environment in living cells where calcium ions are usually at least a thousandfold less concentrated than magnesium.

The pK_{a} for binding of calcium ions by tetrabasic EGTA is 11.00, but the protonated forms do not significantly contribute to binding, so at pH 7, the apparent pK_{a} becomes 6.91. See Qin et al. for an example of a pK_{a} calculation.

EGTA has also been used experimentally for the treatment of animals with cerium poisoning and for the separation of thorium from the mineral monazite. EGTA is used as a compound in elution buffer in the protein purification technique known as tandem affinity purification, in which recombinant fusion proteins are bound to calmodulin beads and eluted out by adding EGTA.

EGTA is often employed in dentistry and endodontics for the removal of the smear layer.

== See also ==
- EDTA
- BAPTA
