= BTBP =

Class of tetradentate ligand compounds

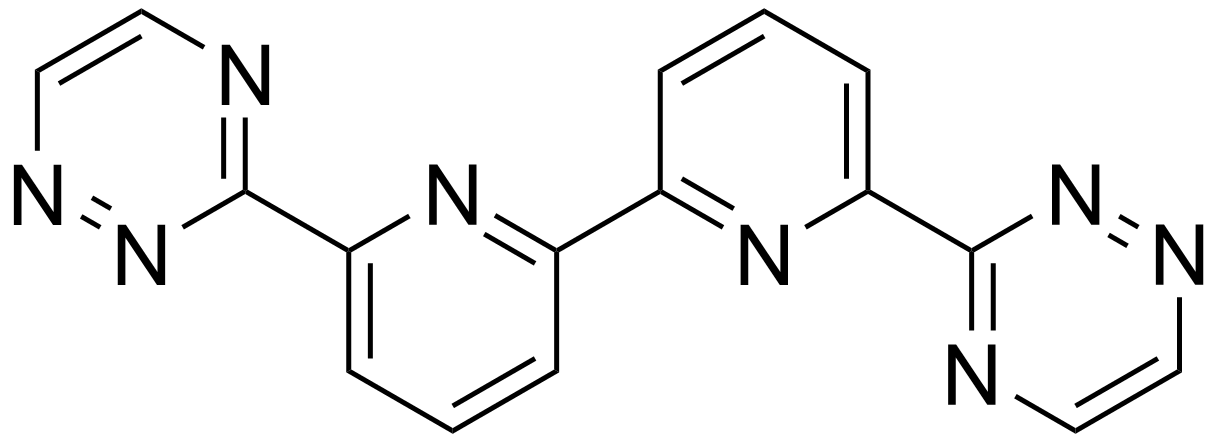
Core chemical structure of a bis-triazinyl bipyridine

The bis-triazinyl bipyridines (BTBPs) are a class of chemical compounds which are tetradentate ligands similar in shape to quaterpyridine. The BTBPs are made by the reaction of hydrazine and a 1,2-diketone (such as hexane-3,4-dione) with 6,6'-dicyano-2,2'-bipyridine. The dicyanobipy can be made by reacting 2,2'-bipy with hydrogen peroxide in acetic acid, (followed by the addition of acetone) to form 2,2'-bipyridine-N,N-dioxide. The 2,2'-bipyridine-N,N-dioxide is then converted into the dicyano compound by treatment with potassium cyanide and benzoyl chloride in a mixture of water and THF.

The BTBPs were first reported as synthetic intermediates in the synthesis of quaterpyridines by a Diels-Alder reaction of the triazine ring with tributylstannylacetylene or norbornadiene, after the Diels-Alder reaction a series of other reactions cause the adjunct to lose a molecule of nitrogen and a molecule of cyclopentadiene to form the pyridine ring.

The BTBPs are related to the BTPs, the BTPs are the bis-triazinyl pyridines which were introduced to solvent extraction by Z. Kolarik. By extending the central part of the BTPs the BTBPs were created.

The synthesis of the BTBPs as solvent extraction reagents was a development of the chemistry at Reading in Berkshire which was done during the PARTNEW EU funded project on advanced nuclear reprocessing, the hemi-BTPs had been made from 2,2'-bipyridine-N-oxide this chemistry was then extended to form the BTBPs. The research continued during the EUROPART integrated project and in the ACSEPT project. With lanthanides the BTBPs bind with four nitrogens to form complexes, the trinitrate complexes of most of the lanthanides have been characterised by X-ray crystallography, with a smaller metal such as nickel the BTBPs are may bind with three nitrogens in some complexes. The perchlorate salts of both the 1:1 and 1:2 complexes of nickel and a BTBP have been characterised by crystallography. The 1:1 complex has a single BTBP which binds through four nitrogen atoms to the metal atom, the four BTBP nitrogens form an equatorial plane and two acetonitrile molecules occupy the two axial sites. Two BTBP molecules each bind with three nitrogens in the 1:2 complex to provide the nickel with a distorted octahedral coordination environment. Uranium(VI) binds to BTBP to form a 1:1 complex, where the axial sites are occupied with the uranyl oxygen atoms. The BTBPs are also able to bind to cyclopentadienyl complexes of uranium.

In recent years the BTBPs have been investigated as reagents for the selective extraction of post-plutonium metals such as americium from nitric acid solutions containing large amounts of lanthanides. Already one of the BTBPs has been shown to be able to selectively extract the americium and curium from a genuine mixture formed from used MOX fuel. The MOX fuel was dissolved in nitric acid, the bulk of the uranium and plutonium were removed by means of a PUREX type extraction using tributyl phosphate in a hydrocarbon, the lanthanides and the remaining actinides were then separated from the aqueous residue (raffinate) by a diamide based extraction to give, after stripping, a mixture of trivalent actinides and lanthanides.
