= Simple Green =

Brand of cleaning products

- Current owner: Sunshine Makers, Inc.
- Introduced: 1979
- Markets: All-purpose cleaners
- Website: www.simplegreen.com

Simple Green is an American brand of cleaning products produced by Sunshine Makers, Inc. Their best known product is Simple Green All-Purpose Cleaner, which totaled sales of at least US $5.7 million in 2004.

It is advertised as an environmentally friendly, non-toxic, and biodegradable cleaner. A prior formulation received critical attention from environmental safety activists because of the toxicity concerns of 2-butoxyethanol (EGBE), which was in the formula at under 4%. As of 2013, 2-butoxyethanol has been removed from Simple Green all-purpose cleaner, so now it has an NFPA/HMIS rating of 0/minimal for Health, Fire, Reactivity, and Special. Its main competitors are Lysol, Clorox, and Windex.

== Environmental uses ==
Simple Green has been re-listed as an approved Surface Washing Agent per the EPA's National Contingency Plan after being de-listed in 1995. The new 2013 re-formulation, SW-65 was re-listed with the EPA on 7/09/2013 EPA toxicity testing reports that Menidia beryllina and Mysidopsis bahia survive slightly better in a water solution of 1:10 mixture of Simple Green with crude oil#2 (LC50 = 8.30 ppm for 96 h and 4.40 ppm for 48 h) than in a water solution of crude oil #2 (LC50 = 6.50 ppm for 96 h and 3.70 ppm for 48 h).

In 2001, Crystal Simple Green was used to clean up an oil spill in the Baltic Sea. In 2005, laboratory testing on rainbow trout indicated that Crystal Simple Green alone did not affect the survival of rainbow trout adults or fry. Crude oil #2 did not affect adults. but did increase the mortality rate of fry to 36%. Crystal Simple Green combined with crude oil #2 did not affect adults but did increase the mortality rate of fry to 46%.

Simple Green has also been used for soil remediation projects.

== Ingredients ==
Simple Green lists the ingredients of their all-purpose cleaner as

Ingredient	CAS Registry Number
Water	7732-18-5
C9-11 (?) alcohols ethoxylated	68439-46-3
Sodium citrate	68-04-2
Tetrasodium glutamate diacetate (also listed as Tetrasodium N,N-bis(carboxymethyl)-L-glutamate)	51981-21-6
Sodium carbonate	497-19-8
Citric acid	77-92-9
Fragrance	N/A
Liquitint colorant	N/A
Preservative	55965-84-9

The manufacturer's Ingredient Disclosure list for Simple Green® All-Purpose Cleaner includes methylchloroisothiazolinone and methylisothiazolinone.
