= C6H12N2O4 =

The molecular formula C_{6}H_{12}N_{2}O_{4} (molar mass: 176.17 g/mol, exact mass: 176.0797 u) may refer to:

- DMDNB
- Ethylenediaminediacetic acid (EDDA)
