= Aminocarboxylic acid =

In chemistry, aminocarboxylic acid can refer to:

- Carbamic acid
- Aminopolycarboxylic acid
- Amino acid
