= Tum-E Yummies =

Brand of fruit-flavored water drinks

Tum-e Yummies
- Type: Fruit Flavored Water Drink
- Manufacturer: The Coca-Cola Company
- Distributor: The Coca-Cola Company
- Country of origin: United States
- Introduced: 2007
- Website: http://www.tumeyummies.com

Tum-e Yummies is an American brand of fruit flavored water drinks. The drinks come in a 10 US fluid ounces (300 ml) bottle with a resealable sports cap. They have 50 calories, 13g of sugar, and contain 100% daily value of vitamins C, B6 and B12 per bottle. In one bottle, the contents read, "Filtered water, high-fructose corn syrup, less than 0.5% of citric acid (provides tarteness), natural flavors, vitamin C (ascorbic acid), sucralose, potassium sorbate and potassium benzoate and calcium disodium EDTA (to protect taste), vitamin B6 (pyridoxine hydrochloride), vitamin B12 (cyanocobalamin)". In April 2018, the brand launched a new look, including a new logo, tagline, and flavor names. The flavors are now called Big Berry Blast, Edgy Orange Burst, Fruit Punch Party, Epic Apple Flip, and Rad Raspberry Zing. Tum-e Yummies is sold throughout the United States in the juice aisle or cooler in stores like Walmart and Kroger, and other grocery, convenience, value, and mass merchandiser stores.

The brand was created in 2007 by BYB Brands, Inc., a brand innovation and development company which at the time was a wholly owned subsidiary of Coca-Cola Bottling Consolidated Company. In 2015, The Coca-Cola Company purchased Tum-e Yummies and the brand continues to be produced and distributed exclusively through the Coca-Cola System.
