= Pentadentate ligand =

Ligand which binds 5 donor atoms in a coordination complex

Ethylenediaminetriacetic acid (H3ED3A); its trianionic conjugate base can function as a pentadentate ligand

A pentadentate ligand (or quinquidentate ligand) is a ligand that coordinates via five donor atoms.

There are different possible ways for a ligand to arrange around an ion. For an octahedral coordination with six positions, the possible arrangements of a linear pentadentate ligand are designated by ffm_{s} ffm_{a} fff fmf fm_{a}m_{a} fm_{s}m_{a} fm_{s}m_{s} fm_{a}m_{s} where each letter f or s represents three consecutive donor atoms: f represents facial fac arrangement, m is meridianal mer, a is "anti" and s is "syn" for positioning of the mer arrangement relative to other donors.

For a chain branched at the donor atom the tertiary atom will have two chains of length one and one of length one attached. The pattern can use parenthesis: () to indicate a side chain, e.g. NNM(N)N. For octahedral coordination there are four arrangements designated: f(m)m f(f)f f(f)m_{a} and f(f)m_{s} where the parenthesis ow indicate how the side chain participates in coordination.

Ligands with four donor atoms on four chains around a central donor atom, will organise around the metal atom equatorially.

The metal may be five-coordinate with arrangements being square-pyramidal or trigonal-bipyramidal, or somewhere between the two.

2,2':6',2'':6'',2''':6''',2''''-Quinquepyridine is fairly rigid, and tries to be in a plane, so coordination will be pentagonal planar. For silver it is planar, but for rhenium it slightly twists to a helix.

== Examples ==
IUPAC name	name	abbreviation	type	pKa	Metals	ref
N^{1}-(2-aminoethyl)-N^{2}-(2-((2-aminoethyl)amino)ethyl)ethane-1,2-diamine	tetraethylenepentamine	tepa	NNNNN	2.65, 4.25, 7.87, 9.08 and 9.92	Mn Fe Co Ni Cu Zn	
N1-(2-(dimethylamino)ethyl)-N2-(2-((2-(dimethylamino)ethyl)(methyl)amino)ethyl)-N1,N2-dimethylethane-1,2-diamine		Me7-tetren	NNNNN		Co(II), Ni(II), Cu(I), Cu(II) and Zn(II)	

== See also ==
- Denticity
