= Denticity =

Number of atoms in a ligand that bond to the central atom of a coordination complex

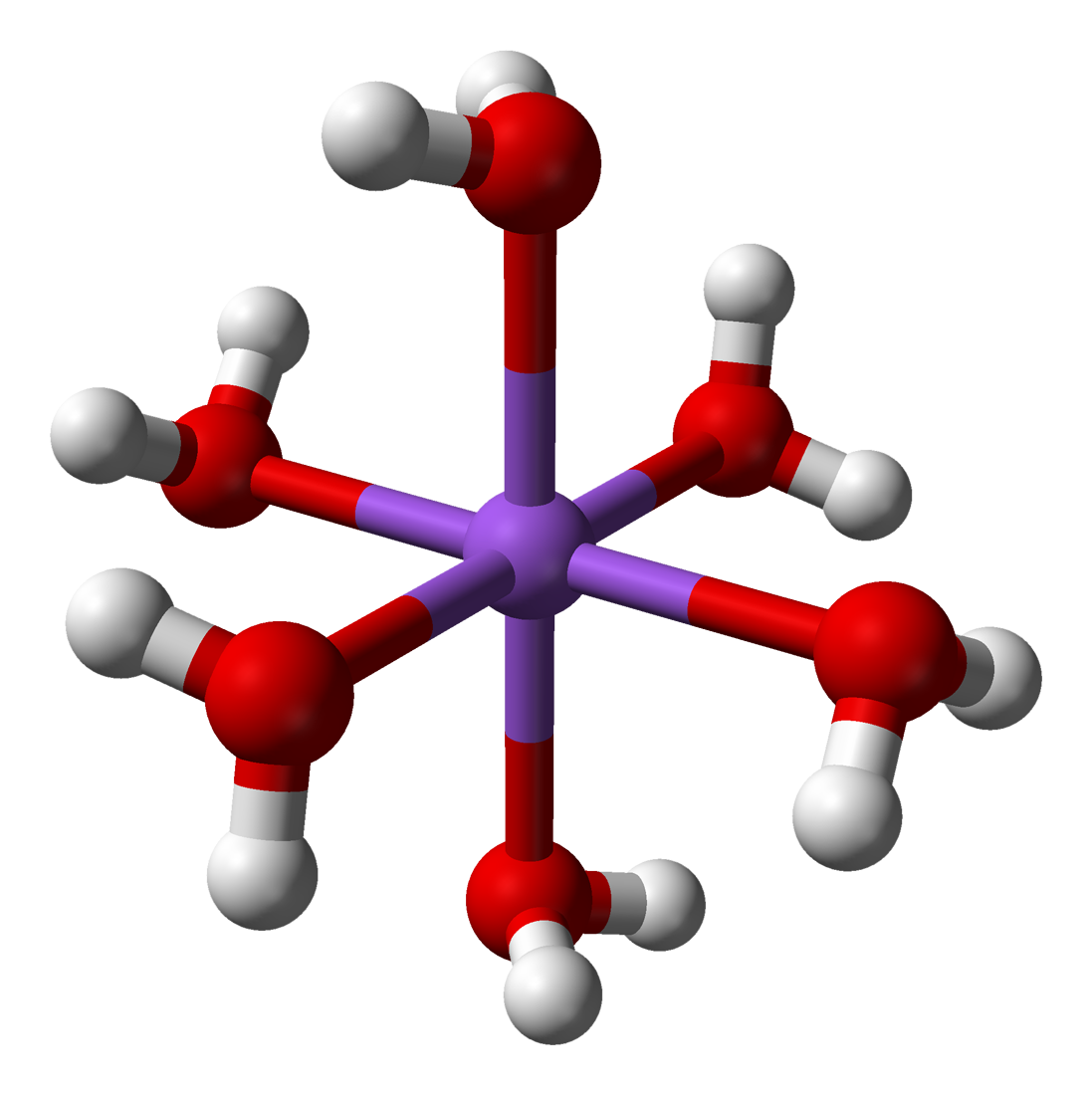
Atom with monodentate ligands

In coordination chemistry, denticity (from Latin dentis 'tooth') refers to the number of donor groups in a given ligand that bind to the central metal atom in a coordination complex. In many cases, only one atom in the ligand binds to the metal, so the denticity equals one, and the ligand is said to be unidentate or monodentate. Ligands with more than one bonded atom are called multidentate or polydentate. The denticity of a ligand is described with the Greek letter κ ('kappa'). For example, κ^{6}-EDTA describes an EDTA ligand that coordinates through 6 non-contiguous atoms.

Denticity is different from hapticity because hapticity refers exclusively to ligands where the coordinating atoms are contiguous. In these cases the η ('eta') notation is used. Bridging ligands use the μ ('mu') notation.

== Classes ==
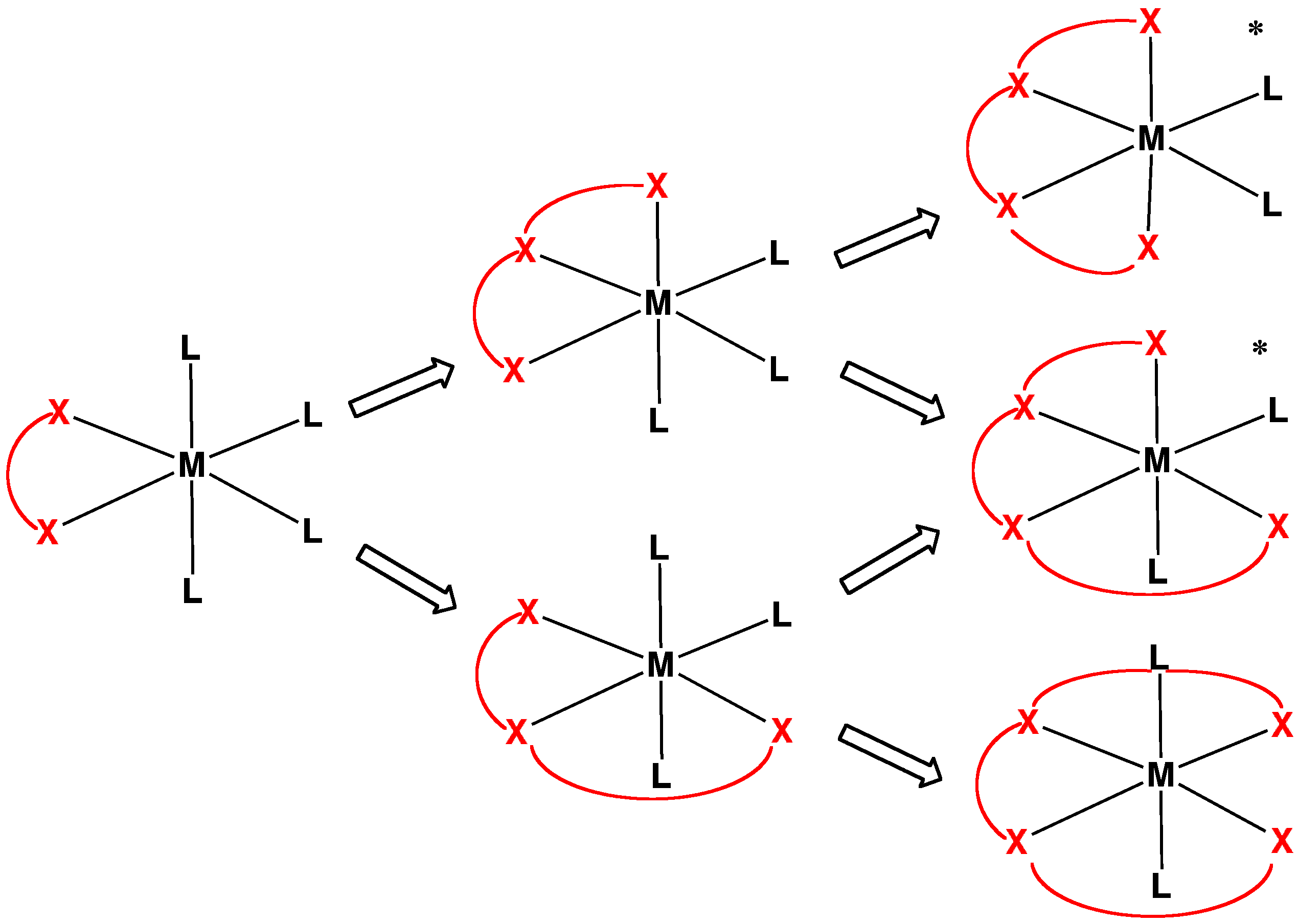
Relationship between "linear" bi-, tri- and tetradentate ligands (red) bound to an octahedral metal center. The structures marked with * are chiral owing to the backbone of the tetradentate ligand.

Polydentate ligands are chelating agents and classified by their denticity. Some atoms cannot form the maximum possible number of bonds a ligand could make. In that case one or more binding sites of the ligand are unused. Such sites can be used to form a bond with another chemical species.

Structure of the pharmaceutical Oxaliplatin, which features two different bidentate ligands.

- Bidentate (also called didentate) ligands bind with two atoms, an example being ethylenediamine.
- Tridentate ligands bind with three atoms, an example being terpyridine. Tridentate ligands usually bind via two kinds of connectivity, called mer and fac. fac stands for facial, the donor atoms are arranged on a triangle around one face of the octahedron. mer stands for meridian, where the donor atoms are stretched out around one half of the octahedron. Cyclic tridentate ligands such as TACN and 9-ane-S3 bind in a facial manner.
- Quadridentate or tetradentate ligands bind with four donor atoms, an example being triethylenetetramine (abbreviated trien). For different central metal geometries there can be different numbers of isomers depending on the ligand's topology and the geometry of the metal center. For octahedral metals, the linear tetradentate trien can bind via three geometries. Tripodal tetradentate ligands, e.g. tris(2-aminoethyl)amine, are more constrained, and on octahedra leave two cis sites (adjacent to each other). Many naturally occurring macrocyclic ligands are tetradentative, an example being the porphyrin in heme. On an octahedral metal these leave two vacant sites opposite each other.
- Quinquidentate or pentadentate ligands bind with five atoms, an example being ethylenediaminetriacetic acid.
- Sexidentate or hexadentate ligands bind with six atoms, an example being EDTA (although it can bind in a tetradentate manner).

=== High denticity ligands ===
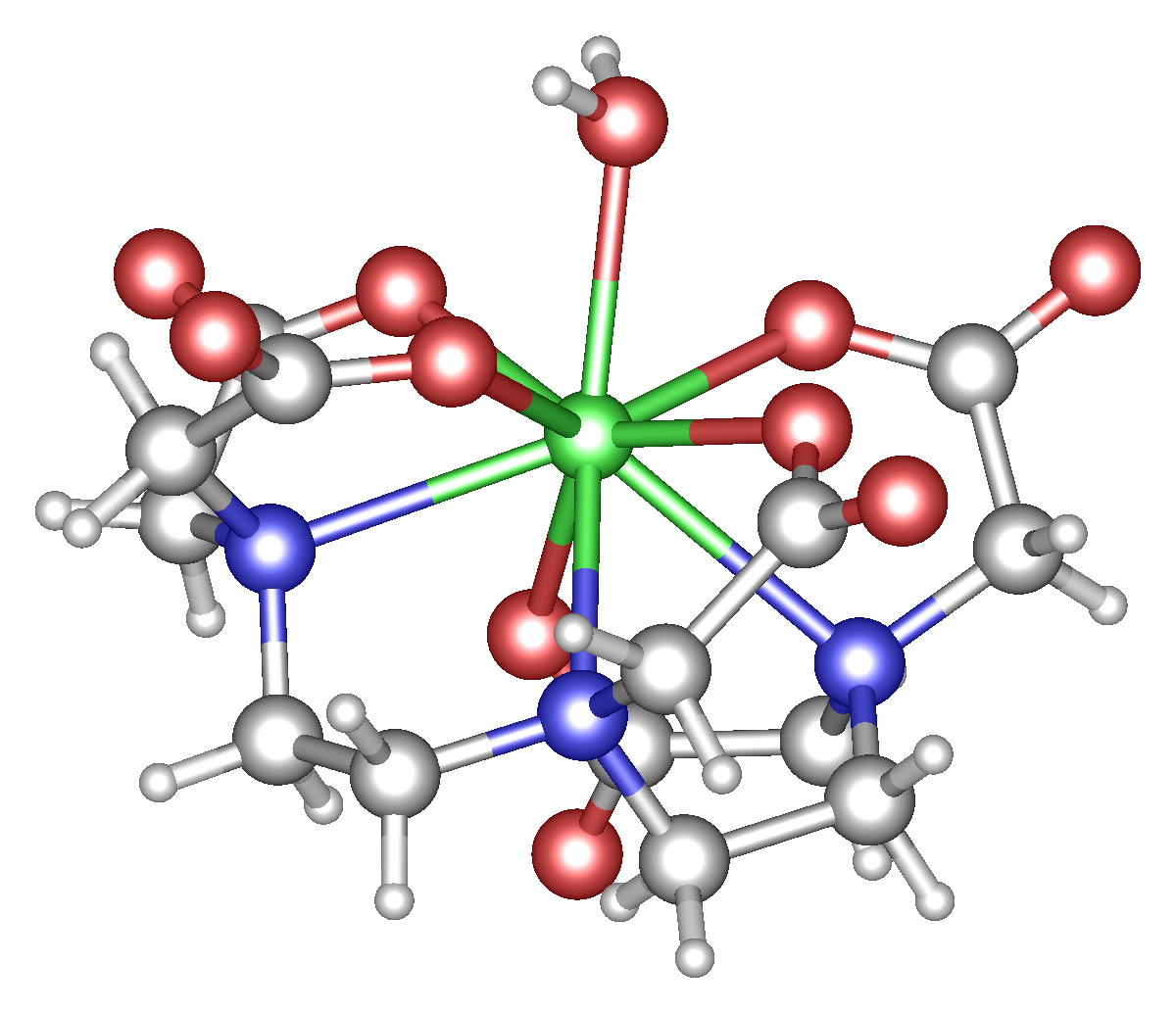
Structure of the ytterbium complex of DTPA^{5-}. Like related lanthanide complexes, the DTPA wraps around the metal ion as a octadentate (κ^{8}-) ligand. Water is also bound to Yb^{3+}, giving it a coordination number of nine. Color code: red = O, blue = N, green = Yb

Larger ions, such as the lanthanides, Ca^{2+}, and Ba^{2+} prefer coordination numbers greater than 6. For firmly binding these ions, ligands of denticity greater than six are often used. One example is the triaminopentacarboxylate (APCA) derived from pentetic acid (HO_{2}CH_{2}N(CH_{2}N(CH_{2}CO_{2}H)_{2})_{2}. A related ligand is 1,4,7,10-tetraazacyclododecane-1,4,7,10-tetraacetate (DOTA).

The conjugate base of diethylenetriaminepentaacetic acid (DTPA) has a high affinity for metal cations. Thus, the penta-anion DTPA^{5−} is potentially an octadentate ligand assuming that each nitrogen centre and each –COO^{−} group counts as a centre for coordination

== Stability constants ==
In general, the stability of a metal complex correlates with the denticity of the ligands, which can be attributed to the chelate effect. Polydentate ligands such as hexa- or octadentate ligands tend to bind metal ions more strongly than ligands of lower denticity, primarily due to entropic factors. Stability constants are a quantitative measure to assess the thermodynamic stability of coordination complexes.

== See also ==
- Chelate
