= Ethylenediaminetriacetic acid =

Names
- Other names H3ed3a

Identifiers
CAS Number	688-57-3
3D model (JSmol)	Interactive image
ChEBI	CHEBI:132232
ChemSpider	146773
ECHA InfoCard	100.108.065
EC Number	614-744-4
KEGG	C21396
PubChem CID	167782
CompTox Dashboard (EPA)	DTXSID80218909
- InChI: InChI=1S/C8H14N2O6/c11-6(12)3-9-1-2-10(4-7(13)14)5-8(15)16/h9H,1-5H2,(H,11,12)(H,13,14)(H,15,16) Key: OUDSFQBUEBFSPS-UHFFFAOYSA-N
- SMILES: C(CN(CC(=O)O)CC(=O)O)NCC(=O)O

Properties
Chemical formula	C_{8}H_{14}N_{2}O_{6}
Molar mass	234.208 g·mol^{−1}
Appearance	white solid
- Except where otherwise noted, data are given for materials in their standard state (at 25 °C [77 °F], 100 kPa). Infobox references

Ethylenediaminetriacetic acid is an organic compound with the formula HO_{2}CCH_{2}N(H)CH_{2}CH_{2}N(CH_{2}CO_{2}H)_{2}. It is a chelating agent of the aminopolycarboxylate class, related to ethylenediaminetetraacetic acid and the ethylenediaminediacetic acids. Its trianionic conjugate base functions as a pentadentate ligand. The material is of interest because it is a product of the degradation of metal-EDTA complexes. The ligand can be modified at the secondary amine for immobilization.

The ligand can be prepared analogously to EDTA or the titanium-EDTA complex can be degraded selectively.
