= Trisodium dicarboxymethyl alaninate =

Names
- Other names * N,N-Bis(carboxymethyl)-DL-alanine trisodium salt: N-(1-Carboxyethyl)-iminodiacetic acid; α-Alanindiacetic acid; α-ADA; MGDA-Na_{3}; Trilon M

Identifiers
CAS Number	164462-16-2
3D model (JSmol)	Interactive image
ChemSpider	9197166
ECHA InfoCard	100.120.943
EC Number	605-362-9
PubChem CID	11021984
UNII	784K2O81WY
CompTox Dashboard (EPA)	DTXSID2044555
- InChI: InChI=1S/C7H11NO6.3Na/c1-4(7(13)14)8(2-5(9)10)3-6(11)12;;;/h4H,2-3H2,1H3,(H,9,10)(H,11,12)(H,13,14);;;/q;3*+1/p-3 Key: OHOTVSOGTVKXEL-UHFFFAOYSA-K
- SMILES: CC(C(=O)[O-])N(CC(=O)[O-])CC(=O)[O-].[Na+].[Na+].[Na+]

Properties
Chemical formula	C_{7}H_{8}NNa_{3}O_{6}
Molar mass	271.111 g·mol^{−1}
Density	* 0.690 g/cm^{3} as powder: 1.31 g/cm^{3} as ~40% aqueous solution at 20 °C; 1.464 g/cm^{3} as 56-58% aqueous solution at 20 °C

Hazards
- GHS labelling
Pictograms	(GHS05: Corrosive)
Signal word	Warning
Hazard statements	H290
Precautionary statements	P234, P390, P404
- Except where otherwise noted, data are given for materials in their standard state (at 25 °C [77 °F], 100 kPa). Infobox references

Trisodium N-(1-carboxylatoethyl)iminodiacetate, methylglycinediacetic acid trisodium salt (MGDA-Na3) or trisodium α-DL-alanine diacetate (α-ADA), is the trisodium anion of N-(1-carboxyethyl)iminodiacetic acid and a tetradentate complexing agent. It forms stable 1:1 chelate complexes with cations having a charge number of at least +2, e.g. the "hard water forming" cations Ca^{2+} or Mg^{2+}. α-ADA is distinguished from the isomeric β-alaninediacetic acid by better biodegradability and therefore improved environmental compatibility.

== Production ==
The patent literature on the industrial synthesis of trisodium N-(1-carboxylatoethyl)iminodiacetate describes the approaches for solving the key requirements of a manufacturing process that can be implemented on an industrial scale, characterized by

- Achieving the highest possible space-time yields
- Simple reaction control at relatively low pressures and temperatures
- Realization of continuous process options
- Achieving the lowest possible levels of impurities, particularly nitrilotriacetic acid, which is suspected of being carcinogenic
- Use of inexpensive raw materials, e.g. instead of pure L-alanine the raw mixture of Strecker synthesis from methanal, hydrogen cyanide and ammonia
- Avoidance of complex and yield-reducing isolation steps; instead, direct further use of the crude reaction solutions or precipitates in the following process step.

An obvious synthesis route to α-alaninediacetic acid is from racemic α-DL-alanine, which provides racemic α-ADA by double cyanomethylation with methanal and hydrogen cyanide, hydrolysis of the intermediately formed diacetonitrile to the trisodium salt and subsequent acidification with mineral acids in a 97.4% overall yield. In a later patent specification, however, only an overall yield of 77% and an NTA content of 0.1% is achieved with practically the same quantities of substances and under practically identical reaction conditions.

This later patent specification also indicates a process route via alaninonitrile, which is obtained by Strecker synthesis from hydrogen cyanide, ammonia and methanal and converted to methylglycinonitrile-N,N-diacetonitrile by double cyanomethylation (step 1). The three nitrile groups are then hydrolyzed with sodium hydroxide to α-ADA (step 2). The total yield is given as 72%, the NTA content as 0.07%.

One variant of the reaction involves iminodiacetonitrile or iminodiacetic acid (step 1'), which reacts in a weakly acidic medium (pH 6) with hydrogen cyanide and ethanal to form methylglycinonitrile-N,N-diacetic acid, the nitrile group of which is hydrolyzed with sodium hydroxide to trisodium N-(1-carboxylatoethyl)iminodiacetate (step 2'). The reactant iminodiacetic acid is accessible at low cost by dehydrogenation of diethanolamine. Again, the total yield is given as 72%, the NTA content as 0.07%.

A further variant is suitable for continuous production, in which ammonia, methanal and hydrogen cyanide react at pH 6 to form iminodiacetonitrile, which in a strongly acidic medium (pH 1.5) reacts with ethanal to produce trinitrile methylglycinonitrile-N,N-diacetonitrile in a very good yield of 92%. (step 1).

Alkaline hydrolysis (step 2) results in a total yield of 85% trisodium N-(1-carboxylatoethyl)iminodiacetate with an NTA content of 0.08%. This process variant seems to fulfil the above-mentioned criteria best.

A low by-product synthesis route for trisodium N-(1-carboxylatoethyl)iminodiacetate has recently been described, in which alanine is ethoxylated with ethylene oxide in an autoclave to form bis-hydroxyethylaminoalanine and then oxidized to α-ADA at 190 °C with Raney copper under pressure.

The yields are over 90% d.Th., the NTA contents below 1%. The process conditions make this variant rather less attractive.

== Properties ==
The commercially available trisodium N-(1-carboxylatoethyl)iminodiacetate (84% by weight) is a colourless, water-soluble solid whose aqueous solutions are rapidly and completely degraded even by non-adapted bacteria. Aquatic toxicity to fish, daphnia and algae is low. Trisodium N-(1-carboxylatoethyl)iminodiacetate is described as readily biodegradable (OECD 301C) and is eliminated to >90 % in wastewater treatment plants. Trisodium N-(1-carboxylatoethyl)iminodiacetate has not yet been detected in the discharge of municipal and industrial sewage treatment plants. In addition to their very good biodegradability, trisodium N-(1-carboxylatoethyl)iminodiacetate solutions are characterized by high chemical stability even at temperatures above 200 °C (under pressure) in a wide pH range between 2 and 14 as well as high complex stability compared to other complexing agents of the aminopolycarboxylate type.

The following table shows the complexing constants log K of α-ADA compared to tetrasodium iminodisuccinate and ethylenediaminetetraacetic acid (EDTA) versus polyvalent metal ions:

Metal ions	MGDA	IDS	EDTA
Ba^{2+}	4.9	3.4	7.9
Ag^{+}		3.9	7.3
Sr^{2+}	5.2	4.1	
Ca^{2+}	7.0	5.2	10.6
Mg^{2+}	5.8	6.1	8.7
Mn^{2+}	8.4	7.7	13.8
Fe^{2+}	8.1	8.2	14.3
Cd^{2+}	10.6	8.4	16.5
Cr^{3+}		9.6	
Co^{2+}	11.1	10.5	16.3
Zn^{2+}	10.9	10.8	16.5
Pb^{2+}	12.1	11.0	18.0
Ni^{2+}	12.0	12.2	18.6
Cu^{2+}	13.9	13.1	18.8
Al^{3+}		14.1	16.1
Hg^{2+}		14.9	21.8
Fe^{3+}	16.5	15.2	25.1

The complex formation constants of the biodegradable chelators α-ADA and IDS are in a range suitable for industrial use, but clearly below those of the previous standard EDTA.

In solid preparations, trisodium N-(1-carboxylatoethyl)iminodiacetate is stable against oxidizing agents such as perborates and percarbonates, but not against oxidizing acids or sodium hypochlorite.

== Use ==
Like other complexing agents in the aminopolycarboxylic acid class, trisodium N-(1-carboxylatoethyl)iminodiacetate (α-ADA) finds due to its ability to form stable chelate complexes with polyvalent ions (in particular the water hardening agents Ca^{2+} and Mg^{2+}, as well as transition and heavy metal ions such as Fe^{3+}, Mn^{2+}, Cu^{2+}, etc.) use in water softening, in detergents and cleaning agents, in electroplating, cosmetics, paper and textile production. Due to its stability at high temperatures and pH values, α-ADA should be particularly suitable as a substitute for the phosphates banned in the EU from 2017, such as sodium tripolyphosphate (STPP) in tabs for dishwashers.

BASF SE is the most important manufacturer of α-ADA under the brand name Trilon M, has large-scale plants in Ludwigshafen and Lima, Ohio, and is currently expanding its existing capacities with another large-scale plant at Evonik's site in Theodore, Alabama.
