= Tandem affinity purification =

Biochemical purification technique

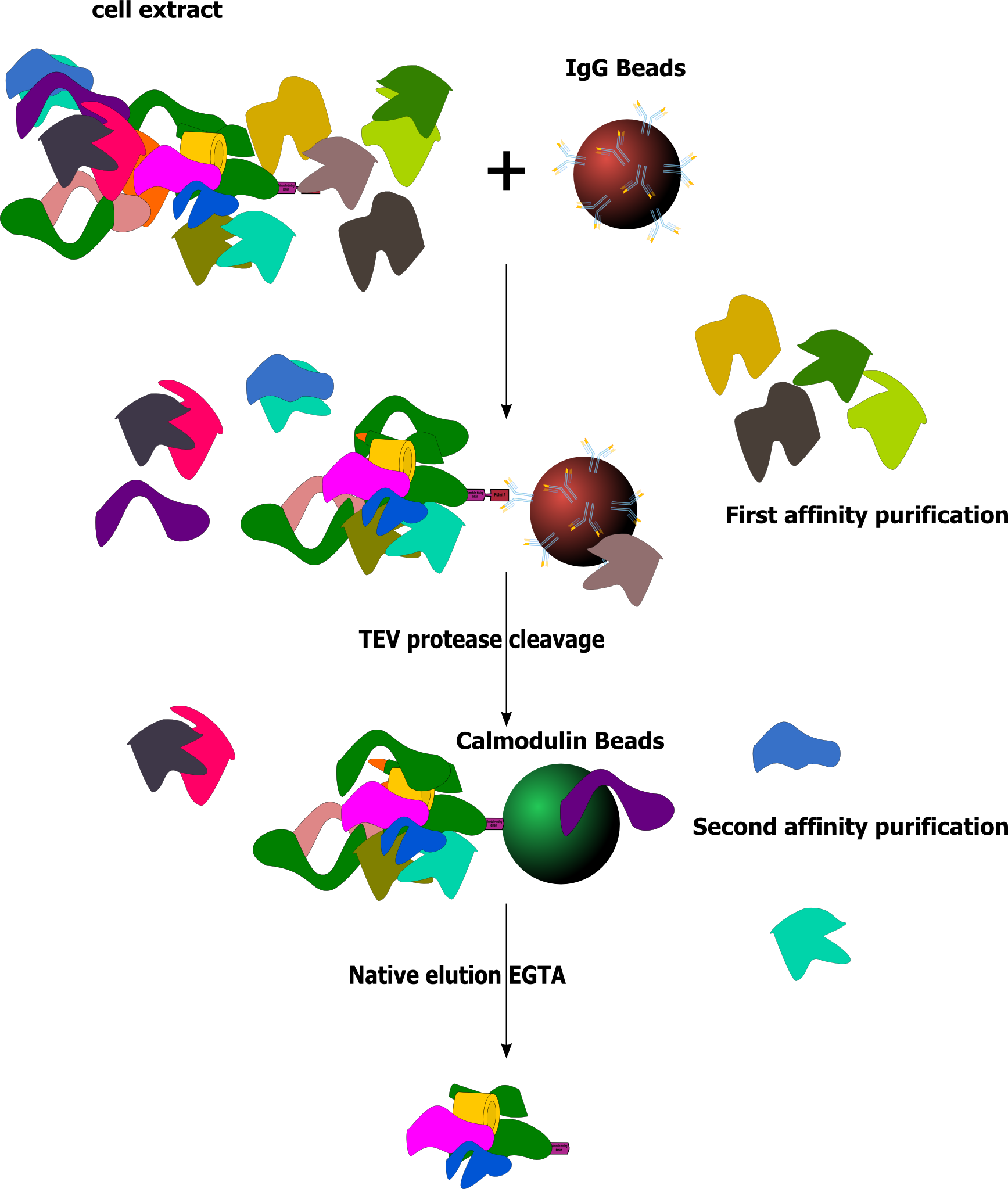

Tandem affinity purification (TAP) is an immunoprecipitation-based purification technique for studying protein–protein interactions. The goal is to extract from a cell only the protein of interest, in complex with any other proteins it interacted with. TAP uses two types of agarose beads that bind to the protein of interest and that can be separated from the cell lysate by centrifugation, without disturbing, denaturing or contaminating the involved complexes. To enable the protein of interest to bind to the beads, it is tagged with a designed piece, the TAP tag.

The original TAP method involves the fusion of the TAP tag to the C-terminus of the protein under study. The TAP tag consists of three components: a calmodulin binding peptide (CBP), TEV protease cleavage site, and two Protein A domains, which bind tightly to IgG (making a TAP tag a type of epitope tag).

Many other tag/bead/eluent combinations have been proposed since the TAP principle was first published.

== Variant tags ==
This tag is also known as the C-terminal TAP tag because an N-terminal version is also available. However, the method to be described assumes the use of a C-terminal tag, although the principle behind the method is still the same.

== History ==
TAP tagging was invented by a research team working in the European Molecular Biology Laboratory in the late 1990s (Rigaut et al., 1999, Puig et al., 2001) and proposed as a new tool for proteome exploration. It was used by the team to characterize several protein complexes (Rigaut et al., 1999, Caspary et al. 1999, Bouveret et al., 2000, Puig et al., 2001). The first large-scale application of this technique was in 2002, in which the research team worked in collaboration with scientists of the proteomics company Cellzome to develop a visual map of the interaction of more than 230 multi-protein complexes in a yeast cell by systematically tagging the TAP tag to each protein. The first successful report of using TAP tag technology in plants came in 2004 (Rohila et al., 2004,)

== Process ==
There are a few methods in which the fusion protein can be introduced into the host cells. If the host is yeast, then one of the methods may be the use of plasmids that will eventually translate the fusion protein within the host. Whichever method that is being used, it is preferable to maintain expression of the fusion protein as close as possible to its natural level. Once the fusion protein is translated within the host, it will interact with other proteins, ideally in a manner unaffected by the TAP tag.

Subsequently, the tagged protein (with its binding partners) is retrieved using an affinity selection process.

The first type of bead added is coated with Immunoglobulin G, which binds to the TAP tag's outermost end. The beads, with the proteins of interest, are separated from the lysate via centrifugation. The proteins are then released from the beads by an enzyme (TEV protease) which breaks the tag at the TEV cleavage site in the middle.

After this first purification step, a second type of bead (coated with calmodulin) is added to the released proteins which binds reversibly to the remaining piece of the TAP tag still on the proteins. The beads are again separated by centrifugation, further removing contaminants as well as the TEV protease. Finally, the beads are released by EGTA, leaving behind the native eluate containing only the protein of interest, its bound protein partners and the remaining CBP piece of the TAP tag.

The native eluate can then be analyzed using gel electrophoresis and mass spectrometry to identify the protein's binding partners.

== Advantages ==
An advantage of this method is that there can be real determination of protein partners quantitatively in vivo without prior knowledge of complex composition. It is also simple to execute and often provides high yield. One of the obstacles of studying protein protein interaction is the contamination of the target protein especially when we don’t have any prior knowledge of it. TAP offers an effective, and highly specific means to purify target protein. After 2 successive affinity purifications, the chance for contaminants to be retained in the eluate reduces significantly.

== Disadvantages ==
However, there is also the possibility that a tag added to a protein might obscure binding of the new protein to its interacting partners. In addition, the tag may also affect protein expression levels. On the other hand, the tag may also not be sufficiently exposed to the affinity beads, hence skewing the results.

There may also be a possibility of a cleavage of the proteins by the TEV protease, although this is unlikely to be frequent given the high specificity of the TEV protease.

== Suitability ==
As this method involves at least 2 rounds of washing, it may not be suitable for screening transient protein interactions, unlike the yeast two-hybrid method or in vivo crosslinking with photo-reactive amino acid analogs. However, it is a good method for testing stable protein interactions and allows various degrees of investigation by controlling the number of times the protein complex is purified.

== Applications ==
In 2002, the TAP tag was first used with mass spectrometry in a large-scale approach to systematically analyse the proteomics of yeast by characterizing multiprotein complexes. The study revealed 491 complexes, 257 of them wholly new. The rest were familiar from other research, but now virtually all of them were found to have new components. They drew up a map relating all the protein components functionally in a complex network.

Many other proteomic analyses also involve the use of TAP tag. A research by EMBO (Dziembowski, 2004) identified a new complex required for nuclear pre-mRNA retention and splicing. They have purified a novel trimeric complex composed of 3 other subunits (Snu17p, Bud13p and Pml1p) and find that these subunits are not essential for viability but required for efficient splicing (removal of introns) of pre-mRNA. In 2006, Fleischer et al. systematically identified proteins associated with eukaryotic ribosomal complexes. They used multifaceted mass spectrometry proteomic screens to identify yeast ribosomal complexes and then used TAP tagging to functionally link up all these proteins.

== Other epitope-tag combinations ==
The principle of tandem-affinity purification of multiprotein complexes is not limited to the combination of CBP and Protein A tags used in the original work by Rigaut et al. (1999). For example, the combination of FLAG- and HA-tags has been used since 2000 by the group of Nakatani to purify numerous protein complexes from mammalian cells. Many other tag combinations have been proposed since the TAP principle was published.
