= Hexadentate ligand =

Class of chemical compounds

Generic structure of a metal complex of hexadentate EDTA.

A hexadentate ligand (or sexidentate ligand) is a ligand that combines with a central metal atom with six bonds. Such ligands are desirable because they have high affinities for metal ions as expressed in their formation constants.

== Examples ==
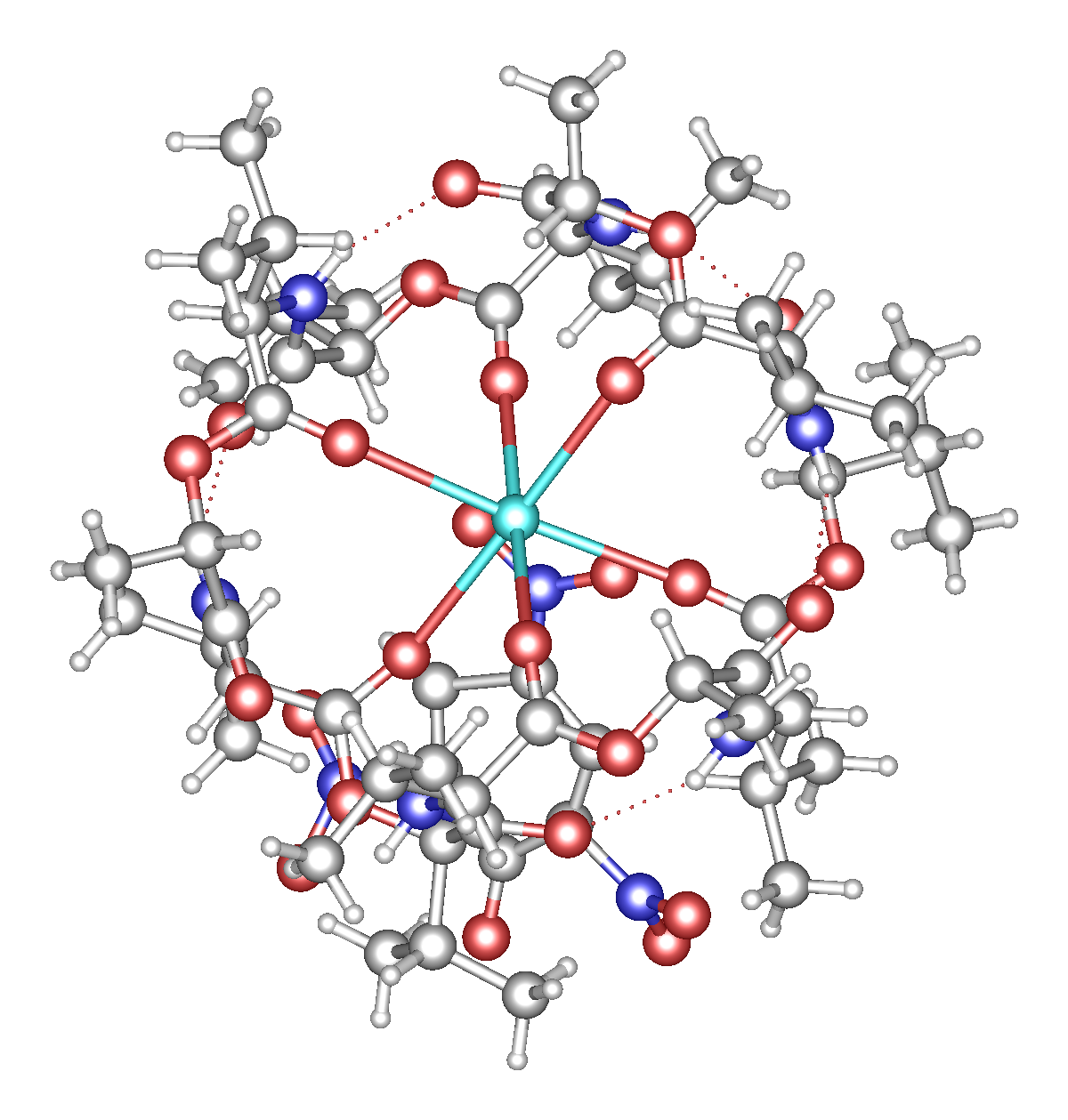
Structure from X-ray crystallography of the potassium (turquoise-colored) cation bound to valinomycin.

Enterobactin is a tris(catechol), which releases six protons when it binds iron(III).

- Aminopolycarboxylates comprise a major class of hexadentate ligands. A commercially important member is EDTA, a tetraanion.
- Siderophores are naturally occurring ligands secreted by organisms to bind iron, required by the organism's metabolism. Those of the catecholate and hydroxamate types are often hexadentate.
- Crown ethers are often hexadentate, presenting six ether donors. For example 18-crown-6 tightly binds K^{+} and NH^{4+} ions. Related thiacrowns and aza-crown ethers are also known. Several antibiotics are hexadentate ligands with comparable polyether bonding motifs. Several polyether antibiotics function as hexadentate ligands.

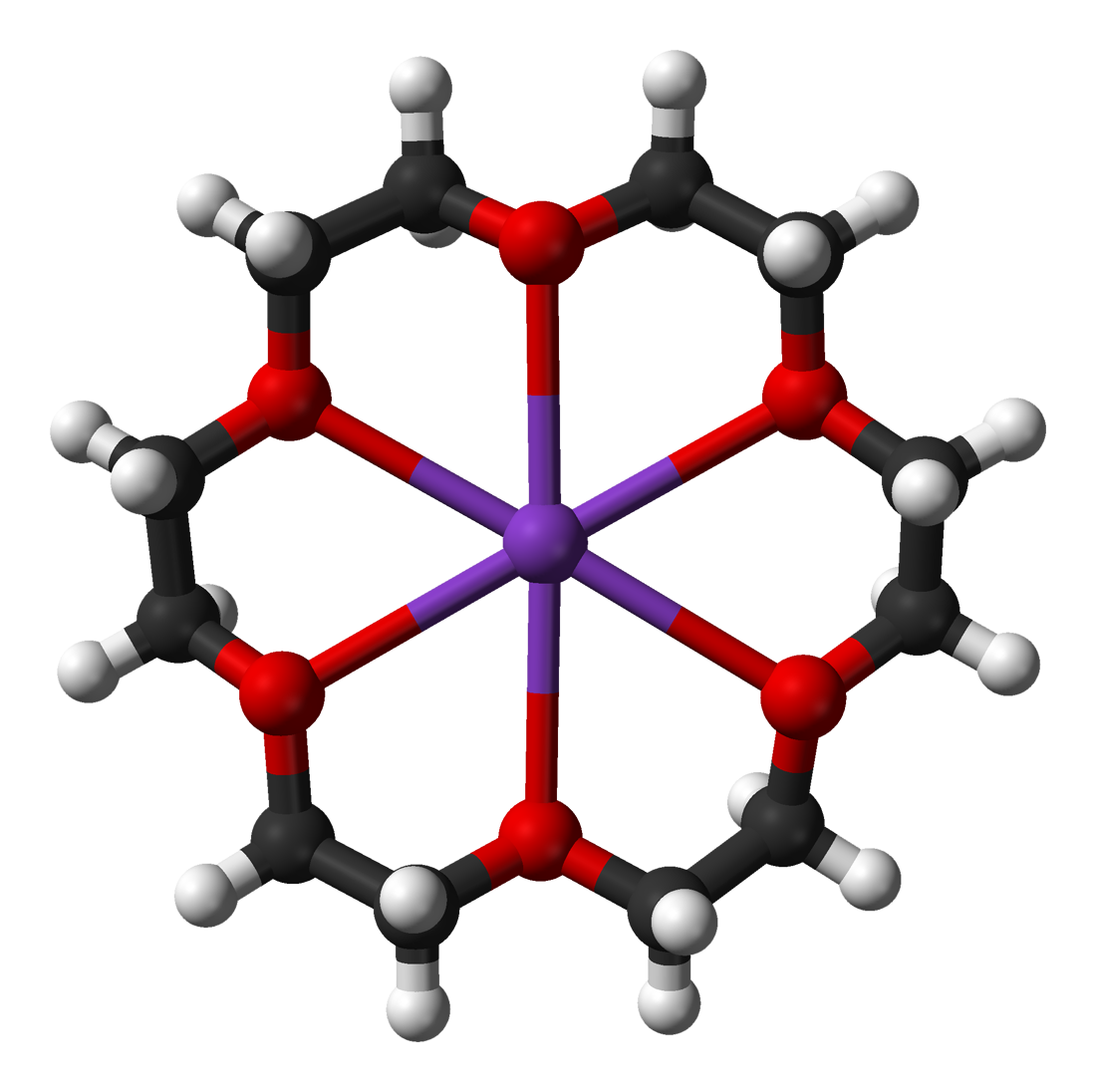
18-Crown-6 coordinating to a potassium ion (shown in violet).

- Clathrochelates are hexadentate ligands constructed around a metal ion.

== Nomenclature ==
In coordination chemistry, the denticity of hexadentate ligands is often denoted with the prefix κ^{6}.

== Topology ==
The arrangement of the donor atoms in hexadentate ligands, its topology, strongly affects the stability of its complexes. Some topologies are simple, such as the linear or ring shapes. The ligand can also be branched, either at a donor atom, or at a non-donor atom. Example shapes are the tripod, and amplector, with a bifurcation at each end. Rigid molecules can be used to force unusual coordination such as trigonal prism. F. Lions identified 36 different hexadentate topologies.
