= Chelation =

Type of chemical bonding with metal ions

Chelation (/kiːˈleɪʃən/) is a type of bonding and sequestration of metal atoms. It involves two or more separate dative covalent bonds between a ligand and a single metal atom, thereby forming a ring structure. The ligand is called a chelant, chelator, chelating agent, or sequestering agent. It is usually an organic compound, but this is not a requirement.

The word chelation is derived from Greek χηλή, chēlē, meaning "claw", because the ligand molecule or molecules hold the metal atom like the claws of a crab. The term chelate (/ˈkiːleɪt/) was first applied in 1920 by Sir Gilbert T. Morgan and H. D. K. Drew, who stated: "The adjective chelate, derived from the great claw or chele (Greek) of the crab or other crustaceans, is suggested for the caliper like groups which function as two associating units and fasten to the central atom so as to produce heterocyclic rings."

Chelation is useful in the preparation of nutritional supplements, in chelation therapy to remove toxic metals from the body, as contrast agents in MRI scanning, in manufacturing using homogeneous catalysts, in chemical water treatment to assist in the removal of metals, and in fertilizers.

== Chelate ring ==
Ethylenediamine binds to a metal by formation of a C_{2}N_{2}M chelate ring.

Bidentate ligands bind to metal ions forming a chelate ring. Ligands of higher denticity form two or more chelate rings. Ethylenediamine, 2,2'-bipyridine, and 1,10-phenanthroline form C_{2}N_{2}M chelate rings. Just like in organic chemistry, 5- and 6-membered chelate rings predominate.

== Chelate effect ==
Cu^{2+} complexes with nonchelating methylamine (left) and chelating ethylenediamine (right) ligands

The chelate effect is the greater affinity of chelating ligands for a metal ion than that of similar nonchelating (monodentate) ligands for the same metal.

The thermodynamic principles underpinning the chelate effect are illustrated by the contrasting affinities of cadmium(II) for ethylenediamine (en) vs. methylamine.

Cd^{2+} + en ⇌ [Cd(en)]^{2+}	1

Cd^{2+} + 2 MeNH_{2} ⇌ [Cd(MeNH_{2})_{2}]^{2+}	2

In (1) the ethylenediamine forms a chelate complex with the cadmium ion. Chelation results in the formation of a five-membered CdC_{2}N_{2} ring. In (2) the bidentate ligand is replaced by two monodentate methylamine ligands of approximately the same donor power, indicating that the Cd–N bonds are approximately the same in the two reactions.

The thermodynamic approach to describing the chelate effect considers the equilibrium constant for the reaction: the larger the equilibrium constant, the higher the concentration of the complex.

[Cd(en)] = β_{11}[Cd][en]	3

[Cd(MeNH_{2})_{2}] = β_{12}[Cd][MeNH_{2}]^{2}	4

Electrical charges have been omitted for simplicity of notation. The square brackets indicate concentration, and the subscripts to the stability constants, β, indicate the stoichiometry of the complex. When the analytical concentration of methylamine is twice that of ethylenediamine and the concentration of copper is the same in both reactions, the concentration [Cd(en)] is much higher than the concentration [Cd(MeNH_{2})_{2}] because β_{11} ≫ β_{12}.

An equilibrium constant, K, is related to the standard Gibbs free energy, $\Delta G^\ominus$ by

$$\Delta G^\ominus = - RT \ln K = \Delta H^\ominus - T \Delta S^\ominus$$

where R is the gas constant and T is the temperature in kelvins. $\Delta H^\ominus$ is the standard enthalpy change of the reaction and $\Delta S^\ominus$ is the standard entropy change.

Since the enthalpy should be approximately the same for the two reactions, the difference between the two stability constants is due to the effects of entropy. In equation (1) there are two particles on the left and one on the right, whereas in equation (2) there are three particles on the left and one on the right. This difference means that less entropy of disorder is lost when the chelate complex is formed with bidentate ligand than when the complex with monodentate ligands is formed. This is one of the factors contributing to the entropy difference. Other factors include solvation changes and ring formation. Some experimental data to illustrate the effect are shown in the following table.

Equilibrium	log β	$\Delta G^\ominus$	$\Delta H^\ominus \mathrm{/kJ\ mol^{-1}}$	$-T\Delta S^\ominus \mathrm{/kJ\ mol^{-1}}$
Cd^{2+} + 2 MeNH_{2} ⇌ Cd(MeNH_{2})_{2}^{2+}	6.55	−37.4	−57.3	19.9
Cd^{2+} + en ⇌ Cd(en)^{2+}	10.62	−60.67	−56.48	−4.19

These data confirm that the enthalpy changes are approximately equal for the two reactions and that the main reason for the greater stability of the chelate complex is the entropy term, which is much less unfavorable. In general it is difficult to account precisely for thermodynamic values in terms of changes in solution at the molecular level, but it is clear that the chelate effect is predominantly an effect of entropy.

Other explanations, including that of Schwarzenbach, are discussed in Greenwood and Earnshaw (loc.cit).

== In nature ==
Numerous biomolecules exhibit the ability to dissolve certain metal cations. Thus, proteins, polysaccharides, and polynucleic acids are excellent polydentate ligands for many metal ions. Organic compounds such as the amino acids glutamic acid and histidine, organic diacids such as malate, and polypeptides such as phytochelatin are also typical chelators. In addition to these adventitious chelators, several biomolecules are specifically produced to bind certain metals (see next section).

Virtually all metalloenzymes feature metals that are chelated, usually to peptides or cofactors and prosthetic groups. Such chelating agents include the porphyrin rings in hemoglobin and chlorophyll. Many microbial species produce water-soluble pigments that serve as chelating agents, termed siderophores. For example, species of Pseudomonas are known to secrete pyochelin and pyoverdine that bind iron. Enterobactin, produced by E. coli, is the strongest chelating agent known. The marine mussels use metal chelation, especially Fe^{3+} chelation with the Dopa residues in mussel foot protein-1 to improve the strength of the threads that they use to secure themselves to surfaces.

In earth science, chemical weathering is attributed to organic chelating agents (e.g., peptides and sugars) that extract metal ions from minerals and rocks. Most metal complexes in the environment and in nature are bound in some form of chelate ring (e.g., with a humic acid or a protein). Thus, metal chelates are relevant to the mobilization of metals in the soil, the uptake and the accumulation of metals into plants and microorganisms. Selective chelation of heavy metals is relevant to bioremediation (e.g., removal of ^{137}Cs from radioactive waste).

== Applications ==
=== Animal feed additives ===
Synthetic chelates such as ethylenediaminetetraacetic acid (EDTA) proved too stable and not nutritionally viable. If the mineral was taken from the EDTA ligand, the ligand could not be used by the body and would be expelled. During the expulsion process, the EDTA ligand randomly chelated and stripped other minerals from the body. According to the Association of American Feed Control Officials (AAFCO), a metal–amino acid chelate is defined as the product resulting from the reaction of metal ions from a soluble metal salt with amino acids, with a mole ratio in the range of 1–3 (preferably 2) moles of amino acids for one mole of metal. The average weight of the hydrolyzed amino acids must be approximately 150 and the resulting molecular weight of the chelate must not exceed 800 Da. Since the early development of these compounds, much more research has been conducted, and has been applied to human nutrition products in a similar manner to the animal nutrition experiments that pioneered the technology. Ferrous bis-glycinate is an example of one of these compounds that has been developed for human nutrition.

=== Dental use ===
Dentin adhesives were first designed and produced in the 1950s based on a co-monomer chelate with calcium on the surface of the tooth and generated very weak water-resistant chemical bonding (2–3 MPa).

=== Chelation therapy ===
Chelation therapy is an antidote for poisoning by mercury, arsenic, and lead. Chelating agents convert these metal ions into a chemically and biochemically inert form that can be excreted. Chelation using sodium calcium edetate has been approved by the U.S. Food and Drug Administration (FDA) for serious cases of lead poisoning. It is not approved for treating "heavy metal toxicity". Although beneficial in cases of serious lead poisoning, use of disodium EDTA (edetate disodium) instead of calcium disodium EDTA has resulted in fatalities due to hypocalcemia. Disodium EDTA is not approved by the FDA for any use, and all FDA-approved chelation therapy products require a prescription.

=== Contrast agents ===
Chelate complexes of gadolinium are often used as contrast agents in MRI scans, although iron particle and manganese chelate complexes have also been explored. Bifunctional chelate complexes of zirconium, gallium, fluorine, copper, yttrium, bromine, or iodine are often used for conjugation to monoclonal antibodies for use in antibody-based PET imaging. These chelate complexes often employ the usage of hexadentate ligands such as desferrioxamine B (DFO), according to Meijs et al., and the gadolinium complexes often employ the usage of octadentate ligands such as DTPA, according to Desreux et al. Auranofin, a chelate complex of gold, is used in the treatment of rheumatoid arthritis, and penicillamine, which forms chelate complexes of copper, is used in the treatment of Wilson's disease and cystinuria, as well as refractory rheumatoid arthritis.

=== Nutritional advantages and issues ===
Chelation in the intestinal tract is a cause of numerous interactions between drugs and metal ions (also known as "minerals" in nutrition). As examples, antibiotic drugs of the tetracycline and quinolone families are chelators of Fe^{2+}, Ca^{2+}, and Mg^{2+} ions.

EDTA, which binds to calcium, is used to alleviate the hypercalcemia that often results from band keratopathy. The calcium may then be removed from the cornea, allowing for some increase in clarity of vision for the patient.

Homogeneous catalysts are often chelated complexes. A representative example is the use of BINAP (a bidentate phosphine) in Noyori asymmetric hydrogenation and asymmetric isomerization. The latter has the practical use of manufacture of synthetic (–)-menthol.

=== Cleaning and water softening ===
A chelating agent is the main component of some rust removal formulations. Citric acid is used to soften water in soaps and laundry detergents. A common synthetic chelator is EDTA. Phosphonates are also well-known chelating agents. Chelators are used in water treatment programs and specifically in steam engineering. Although the treatment is often referred to as "softening", chelation has little effect on the water's mineral content, other than to make it soluble and lower the water's pH level.

=== Fertilizers ===
Metal chelate compounds are common components of fertilizers to provide micronutrients. These micronutrients (manganese, iron, zinc, copper) are required for the health of the plants. Most fertilizers contain phosphate salts that, in the absence of chelating agents, typically convert these metal ions into insoluble solids that are of no nutritional value to the plants. EDTA is the typical chelating agent that keeps these metal ions in a soluble form.

=== Economic situation ===
Because of their wide needs, the overall chelating agents growth was 4% annually during 2009–2014 and the trend is likely to increase. Aminopolycarboxylic acids chelators are the most widely consumed chelating agents; however, the percentage of the greener alternative chelators in this category continues to grow. The consumption of traditional aminopolycarboxylates chelators, in particular the EDTA (ethylenediaminetetraacetic acid) and NTA (nitrilotriacetic acid), is declining (−6% annually), because of the persisting concerns over their toxicity and negative environmental impact. In 2013, these greener alternative chelants represented approximately 15% of the total aminopolycarboxylic acids demand. This is expected to rise to around 21% by 2018, replacing and aminophosphonic acids used in cleaning applications. Examples of some Greener alternative chelating agents include ethylenediamine disuccinic acid (EDDS), polyaspartic acid (PASA), methylglycinediacetic acid (MGDA), glutamic diacetic acid (L-GLDA), citrate, gluconic acid, amino acids, plant extracts etc.

== Reversal ==
Dechelation (or de-chelation) is a reverse process of the chelation in which the chelating agent is recovered by acidifying solution with a mineral acid to form a precipitate.

== See also ==
- EDDS
