= Quaterpyridine =

Names
- IUPAC name 2,2':6',2:6,2'''-Quaterpyridine

Identifiers
CAS Number	2,2':6',2:6,2''': 4392-83-0
3D model (JSmol)	2,2':6',2:6,2''': Interactive image
ChemSpider	9051697
PubChem CID	10876425
- InChI: InChI=1S/C20H14N4/c1-3-13-21-15(7-1)17-9-5-11-19(23-17)20-12-6-10-18(24-20)16-8-2-4-14-22-16/h1-14H Key: SSZWMEZKBBAJLB-UHFFFAOYSA-N
- SMILES: 2,2':6',2:6,2''': C1=CC(=NC=C1)C2=CC=CC(=N2)C3=CC=CC(=N3)C4=CC=CC=N4

Properties
Chemical formula	C_{20}H_{14}N_{4}
Molar mass	310.360 g·mol^{−1}
Appearance	white solid
Melting point	219–220 °C (426–428 °F; 492–493 K)
- Except where otherwise noted, data are given for materials in their standard state (at 25 °C [77 °F], 100 kPa). Infobox references

Quaterpyridine refers to a family of pyridine derivatives with the formula (NC_{5}H_{4}-C_{5}H_{3}N)_{2}. These compounds can also be viewed as bipyridine decorated with two pyridyl substituents. Several isomers are known. All are colorless solids. One particular isomer, 2,2':6',2'':6'',2'''-quaterpyridine, a derivative of 2,2'-bipyridine has attracted interest because it is a potential tetradentate ligand in coordination chemistry.

== Related compounds ==
- terpyridine
- Nemertelline - isomer of quaterpyridine
