= Ethylenediaminediacetic acid =

Names
- Preferred IUPAC name 2,2′-[Ethane-1,2-diylbis(azanediyl)]diacetic acid
- Other names N,N′-Ethylenediglycine

Identifiers
CAS Number	5657-17-0
3D model (JSmol)	Interactive image
ChEBI	CHEBI:132240
ChEMBL	ChEMBL296340
ChemSpider	55826
ECHA InfoCard	100.024.641
EC Number	227-105-6
KEGG	C21397
PubChem CID	61975
UNII	4LX0U5342U
CompTox Dashboard (EPA)	DTXSID7063970
- InChI: InChI=1S/C6H12N2O4/c9-5(10)3-7-1-2-8-4-6(11)12/h7-8H,1-4H2,(H,9,10)(H,11,12) Key: IFQUWYZCAGRUJN-UHFFFAOYSA-N
- SMILES: C(CNCC(=O)O)NCC(=O)O

Properties
Chemical formula	C_{6}H_{12}N_{2}O_{4}
Molar mass	176.172 g·mol^{−1}
Appearance	white solid
Melting point	228 °C (442 °F; 501 K)

Hazards
- GHS labelling
Pictograms	(GHS05: Corrosive) (GHS07: Exclamation mark) (GHS09: Environmental hazard)
Signal word	Danger
Hazard statements	H302, H315, H318, H319, H335, H411
Precautionary statements	P261, P264, P264+P265, P270, P271, P273, P280, P301+P317, P302+P352, P304+P340, P305+P351+P338, P305+P354+P338, P317, P319, P321, P330, P332+P317, P337+P317, P362+P364, P391, P403+P233, P405, P501
- Except where otherwise noted, data are given for materials in their standard state (at 25 °C [77 °F], 100 kPa). Infobox references

Ethylenediaminediacetic acid (EDDA not to be confused with Ethylenediamine diacetate(CAS:38734-69-9) also known as EDDA) is the organic compound with the formula C_{2}H_{4}(NHCH_{2}CO_{2}H)_{2}. It is a derivative of two molecules of glycine, wherein the amines are linked. It is a white solid. It is one of several aminopolycarboxylic acids.

The conjugate base is a tetradentate ligand. A representative complex is Na[Co(EDDA)(CO_{3})].

== Related compounds ==
- ethylenediaminetetraacetic acid
