= EDDS =

- Skeletal formula of EDDS

Names
- IUPAC name Ethylenediamine-N,N′-disuccinic acid

Identifiers
CAS Number	20846-91-7
3D model (JSmol)	Interactive image
ChemSpider	109992; 9489961 2-[(2-{[(1S)-1-Carboxyethyl]amino}ethyl)amino]; 8283888 (2R)-2-[(2-{[(1R)-1-Carboxyethyl]amino}ethyl)amino]; 435376 (2S)-2-[(2-{[(1S)-1-Carboxyethyl]amino}ethyl)amino]
MeSH	N,N'-ethylenediamine+disuccinic+acid
PubChem CID	123395; 11314994 2-[(2-{[(1S)-1-Carboxyethyl]amino}ethyl)amino]; 10108362 (2R)-2-[(2-{[(1R)-1-Carboxyethyl]amino}ethyl)amino]; 497266 (2S)-2-[(2-{[(1S)-1-Carboxyethyl]amino}ethyl)amino]; 46218600 (2S)-2-[(2-{[(1R)-1-Carboxyethyl]amino}ethyl)amino]
UNII	5WK2FGJ113
CompTox Dashboard (EPA)	DTXSID80860260 DTXSID1051852, DTXSID80860260
- InChI: InChI=1S/C10H16N2O8/c13-7(14)3-5(9(17)18)11-1-2-12-6(10(19)20)4-8(15)16/h5-6,11-12H,1-4H2,(H,13,14)(H,15,16)(H,17,18)(H,19,20) Key: VKZRWSNIWNFCIQ-UHFFFAOYSA-N
- SMILES: O=C(O)CC(NCCNC(CC(=O)O)C(=O)O)C(=O)O

Properties
Chemical formula	C_{10}H_{16}N_{2}O_{8}
Molar mass	292.244 g·mol^{−1}
Density	1.44 g mL^{−1}
Melting point	220 to 222 °C (428 to 432 °F; 493 to 495 K)
Acidity (pK_{a})	2.4
Basicity (pK_{b})	11.6

Thermochemistry
Std enthalpy of formation (Δ_{f}H^{⦵}_{298})	−1.9541 to −1.9463 MJ mol^{−1}
Std enthalpy of combustion (Δ_{c}H^{⦵}_{298})	−4.2755 to −4.2677 MJ mol^{−1}

Related compounds
Related alkanoic acids	EDTA
- Except where otherwise noted, data are given for materials in their standard state (at 25 °C [77 °F], 100 kPa). verify (what is ?) Infobox references

Ethylenediamine-N,N'-disuccinic acid (EDDS) is an aminopolycarboxylic acid. It is a colourless solid that is used as chelating agent that may offer a biodegradable alternative to EDTA, which is currently used on a large scale in numerous applications.

== Structure and properties ==
EDDS has two chiral centers, and as such three stereoisomers. These are the enantiomeric (R,R) and (S,S) isomers and the achiral meso (R,S) isomer. As a biodegradable replacement for EDTA, only the (S,S) stereoisomer is of interest. The (R,S) and (R,R) stereoisomers are less biodegradable, whereas the (S,S) stereoisomer has been shown to be very effectively biodegraded even in highly polluted soils.

== Synthesis ==
EDDS was first synthesized from maleic acid and ethylenediamine. Some microorganisms have been manipulated for industrial-scale synthesis of (S,S)-EDDS from ethylenediamine and fumaric acid or maleic acid.

=== From aspartic acid ===
(S,S)-EDDS is produced stereospecifically by the alkylation of an ethylenedibromide with L-aspartic acid. Racemic EDDS is produced by the reaction of ethylenediamine with fumaric acid or maleic acid.

== Coordination chemistry ==
Structure of a generic octahedral complex of EDDS

In comparing the effectiveness of (S,S)-EDDS versus EDTA as chelating agents for iron(III):

Formation reaction	Formation constant
[Fe(H_{2}O)_{6}]^{3+} + (S,S)-EDDS^{4−} → Fe[(S,S)-EDDS]^{−} + 6 H_{2}O	K_{EDDS} = 10^{20.6}
[Fe(H_{2}O)_{6}]^{3+} + EDTA^{4−} → Fe(EDTA)^{−} + 6 H_{2}O	K_{EDTA} = 10^{25.1}

Because of the lower stability for [Fe(S,S)-EDDS]^{−}, the useful range being roughly 3<pH_{(S,S)-EDDS}<9 and 2<pH_{EDTA}<11. However, this range is sufficient for most applications.

Another comparison that can be made between (S,S)-EDDS and EDTA is the structure of the chelated complex. EDTA’s six donor sites form five five-membered chelate rings around the metal ion, four NC_{2}OFe rings and one C_{2}N_{2}Fe ring. The C_{2}N_{2}Fe ring and two of NC_{2}OFe rings define a plane, and two NC_{2}OFe rings are perpendicular to the plane that contains the C_{2}-symmetry axis. The five-membered rings are slightly strained. EDDS’s six donor sites form both five- and six-membered chelate rings around the metal ion: two NC_{2}OFe rings, two NC_{3}OFe rings, and one C_{2}N_{2}Fe ring. Studies of the crystal structure of the Fe[(S,S)-EDDS]^{−} complex show that the two five-membered NC_{3}OFe rings project out of the plane of the complex, reducing the equatorial ring strain that exists in the Fe[EDTA]^{−} complex. The complex also has C_{2} symmetry.

== Uses ==
(S,S)-EDDS is a biodegradable chelating agent that offers an alternative to EDTA, of which 80 million kilograms are produced annually. Under natural conditions, EDTA has been found to convert to ethylenediaminetriacetic acid and then cyclize to the diketopiperazine, which accumulates in the environment as a persistent organic pollutant. (S,S)-EDDS was developed commercially as a biodegradable chelator and stabilizing agent in detergent and cosmetic formulations. When EDDS is applied in chemical-enhanced soil remediation in excessive case (e.g., when applied for ex-situ soil washing), higher extraction efficiency for heavy metals can be achieved and the amount of extraction is less independent with the EDDS dosage; On the other hand, during soil remediation which involves continuous flushing, metal extraction is often limited by the amount of EDDS. Under EDDS deficiency, initial unselective extraction of heavy metals was observed, followed by heavy metal exchange and re-adsorption of heavy metals that have lower stability constant with EDDS.
