= Sodium calcium edetate =

Chemical compound

Clinical data
- Trade names: Calcium disodium versenate, others
- Other names: calcium disodium EDTA, edetate calcium disodium, sodium calcium edetate
- AHFS/Drugs.com: Monograph
- Routes of administration: IV, IM
- Drug class: chelating agent
- ATC code: V03AB03 (WHO)

Legal status
- Legal status: US: WARNING

Identifiers
- IUPAC name: Calcium disodium 2-[2-[bis(carboxylatomethyl)amino]ethyl-(carboxylatomethyl)amino]acetate
- CAS Number: 62-33-9
- PubChem CID: 6093170
- DrugBank: DB00974
- ChemSpider: 5883
- UNII: 8U5D034955
- ChEBI: CHEBI:4757
- E number: E385 (antioxidants, ...)
- CompTox Dashboard (EPA): DTXSID2036409
- ECHA InfoCard: 100.000.482

Chemical and physical data
- Formula: C_{10}H_{12}CaN_{2}Na_{2}O_{8}
- Molar mass: 374.270 g·mol^{−1}
- 3D model (JSmol): Interactive image
- SMILES: C(CN(CC(=O)[O-])CC(=O)[O-])N(CC(=O)[O-])CC(=O)[O-].[Na+].[Na+].[Ca+2]
- InChI: InChI=1S/C10H16N2O8.Ca.2Na/c13-7(14)3-11(4-8(15)16)1-2-12(5-9(17)18)6-10(19)20;;;/h1-6H2,(H,13,14)(H,15,16)(H,17,18)(H,19,20);;;/q;+2;2*+1/p-4; Key:SHWNNYZBHZIQQV-UHFFFAOYSA-J

Sodium calcium edetate (sodium calcium EDTA), also known as edetate calcium disodium among other names, is a medication primarily used to treat lead poisoning, including both short-term and long-term lead poisoning. Sodium calcium edetate came into medical use in the United States in 1953.

== Chelation agent ==
Sodium calcium edetate is in the chelating agent family of medication. It is a salt of edetate with two sodium atoms and one calcium atom. It works by binding to a number of heavy metals, which renders them almost inert and allows them to leave the body in the urine.

Edetate disodium (Endrate) is a different formulation which does not have the same effects.

=== Medical use ===
Sodium calcium edetate's primary use is to treat lead poisoning, for which it is an alternative to succimer. It is given by slow injection into a vein or into a muscle.

For lead encephalopathy sodium calcium edetate is typically used together with dimercaprol. It may also be used to treat plutonium poisoning. It does not appear to be useful for poisoning by tetra-ethyl lead.

=== Side effects ===
Common side effects include pain at the site of injection. Other side effects may include kidney problems, diarrhea, fever, muscle pains, and low blood pressure. Benefits when needed in pregnancy are likely greater than the risks.

== History ==
Sodium calcium edetate came into medical use in the United States in 1953. It is on the World Health Organization's List of Essential Medicines.
