= Gerold Schwarzenbach =

Swiss chemist (1904–1978)

Structure of EDTA

Gerold Karl Schwarzenbach (15 March 1904 — 20 May 1978) was a Swiss chemist.

Schwarzenbach was born and grew up in Horgen, Switzerland. He studied chemistry at the ETH Zurich and graduated in 1928 with his dissertation Studien über die Salzbildung von Beizenfarbstoffen (Studies on the formation of pickling salt dyes). From 1930 to 1955 he was a lecturer and later professor of special inorganic and analytical chemistry at the University of Zurich. He retired in 1973.

One of his main research topics was coordination chemistry. Gerold was substantially involved in the study of EDTA and the involvement of ligands.

== Honours and awards ==
- 1963 Marcel Benoist Prize.
- 1966 Paul Karrer Gold Medal
- 1967 Torbern Bergman Medal.
- 1971 Honorary doctorate from the University of Berne.
