= Tetrasodium iminodisuccinate =

Names
- IUPAC name Tetrasodium N-(1,2-dicarboxylatoethyl)-ξ-aspartate(2−)
- Systematic IUPAC name Tetrasodium 2,2′-azanediyldibutanedioate

Identifiers
CAS Number	144538-83-0
3D model (JSmol)	Interactive image
ChemSpider	8103386
ECHA InfoCard	100.117.797
EC Number	604-420-0
PubChem CID	9927753
UNII	GYS41J2635
CompTox Dashboard (EPA)	DTXSID1051723
- InChI: InChI=1S/C8H11NO8.4Na/c10-5(11)1-3(7(14)15)9-4(8(16)17)2-6(12)13;;;;/h3-4,9H,1-2H2,(H,10,11)(H,12,13)(H,14,15)(H,16,17);;;;/q;4*+1/p-4 Key: GYBINGQBXROMRS-UHFFFAOYSA-J
- SMILES: C(C(C(=O)[O-])NC(CC(=O)[O-])C(=O)[O-])C(=O)[O-].[Na+].[Na+].[Na+].[Na+]

Properties
Chemical formula	C_{8}H_{7}NNa_{4}O_{8}
Molar mass	337.102 g·mol^{−1}
Appearance	colorless crystals
- Except where otherwise noted, data are given for materials in their standard state (at 25 °C [77 °F], 100 kPa). Infobox references

Tetrasodium iminodisuccinate is a sodium salt of iminodisuccinic acid, also referred to as N-(1,2-dicarboxyethyl)aspartic acid.

== Preparation ==
Iminodisuccinic acid can be prepared by reacting maleic anhydride with ammonia and sodium hydroxide:

For the synthesis of tetrasodium iminodisuccinate, maleic anhydride is reacted with sodium hydroxide in water at elevated temperature. A concentrated disodium maleate solution is formed to which ammonia is added at 90 to 145 °C, then excess water and ammonia is distilled off. An aqueous solution containing about 34% tetrasodium iminodisuccinate is obtained with yields of up to 98%. Spray-drying can be used to obtain a mixture of solids consisting of> 65% tetrasodium iminodisuccinate salts (essentially the tetra sodium salts), <2% maleic acid sodium salts, <8% fumaric acid sodium salts, <2% malic acid sodium salts, <15% aspartic acid sodium salts, and >15% water. The by-products of the reaction do not affect the complexing capacity or biodegradability of the tetrasodium iminodisuccinate.

Composition of commercial products in % by weight
Product	IDS-Na_{4} salt	Na_{2} fumarate	Na_{2} aspartate	Na_{2} malate	Na_{2} maleate	water
Industrial cleaner	72,1	5,6	10,6	-	-	8,9
Baypure CX 100/34 %	> 33,0	< 2,5	< 7,0	< 0,5	< 0,3	< 59,0
Baypure CX 100 solid	> 65,0	< 8,0	< 15,0	< 2,0	< 2,0	< 15,0
Baypure CX 100 solid G	> 78,0	< 5,0	< 15,0	< 0,7	< 0,5	< 4,0

== Properties ==
As a commercial product, tetrasodium iminodisuccinate is sold either as a white powder (solid mixture, produced by spray drying of the aqueous solution, Baypure® CX 100) or as granular material with a content of> 78% tetrasodium iminodisuccinate.

Tetrasodium iminodisuccinate is a chelating agent, forming complexes of moderate stability (10^{−16}), which includes (as a pentadentate ligand) alkaline earth and polyvalent heavy metal ions with one molecule of water in an octahedral structure. In 0.25% aqueous solution, a pH of 11.5 results for tetrasodium iminodisuccinate. The salt is stable for several hours in weakly acidic solution (pH> 4-7) even at 100 °C and for weeks in strongly alkaline solutions even at an elevated temperature (50 °C).

Tetrasodium iminodisuccinate is classified as readily biodegradable according to OECD methods (OECD 302 B, 100% after 28 days and OECD 301 E, 78% after 28 days). As biodegradable alternatives from the class of widespread chelating agents, only nitrilotriacetic acid (NTA) is sufficiently biodegradable under certain conditions (which is suspected of being carcinogenic, though) and the chelating active amino acid derivatives β-alaninediacetic acid and methylglycine diacetic acid (Trilon M®).

== Use ==
Iminodisuccinic acid has been distributed by Lanxess since 1998 under the trade name Baypure CX 100 as complexing agent. It reacts with the calcium and magnesium ions in water and forms chelate complexes of medium stability. This complexation prevents the formation of insoluble salts (deposits) and soaps (lime soaps) and thus improves the effect of detergents and dishwashing detergents, hand soaps and shampoos. As a result, the amount of conventional builders in solid detergents (carbonates, silicates, phosphates, citrates, zeolites) can be reduced or fully replaced. The calcium binding capacity for tetrasodium iminodisuccinate is approximately 230 mg CaCO_{3}/g salt and therefore lies between the capacity of DTPA Na_{5} salt (210 mg CaCO_{3} Na salt) and EDTA Na_{4} salt (280 mg CaCO_{3}/g Na-salt).

Also most other applications of tetrasodium iminodisuccinate Na salt are based on the complexation of alkaline earth and heavy metal ions e. g. in industrial cleaners for the removal of biofilms and limescale, cosmetics, in electroplating, in construction (retardation), textile (protection against graying) and paper. When tetrasodium iminodisuccinate is used in solid detergent formulations instead of the common phosphonates, it inhibits the heavy metal ion catalyzed decomposition of hydrogen peroxide in bleach-containing wash liquors.

Complexes of tetrasodium iminodisuccinate with Fe^{3+}, Cu^{2+}, Zn^{2+} and Mn^{2+} ions are used as micronutrients, as they are providing important trace elements for plants in readily absorbable form; both granulated as soil fertilizer and dissolved as foliar spray. The so far commonly in plant protection applied complexing agents such as EDTA, DTPA (diethylenetriamine pentaacetic acid), EDDHA (ethylenediamine dihydroxyphenylacetic acid) or HBED (N,N'-di(2-hydroxybenzyl)ethylenediamine-N, N'-diacetic acid) are difficult to virtually non-biodegradable. In contrast, IDHA trace element complexes offer an interesting alternative.

== Stereoisomerism ==
The preparation from the achiral starting materials provides a mixture of three epimers: (R,R)-iminodisuccinate, (R,S)-iminodisuccinate, and (S,S)-iminodisuccinate. The two meso compounds [R,S] and [S,R] are identical. The enzymatic degradation in the first two cases produces the compounds D-aspartic acid and fumaric acid, and in the third case produces L-aspartic acid and fumaric acid, which are metabolized further.
