= Tetradentate ligand =

Ligand which binds 4 donor atoms in a coordination complex

Protoporphyrin IX, a tetradentate ligand, in a coordination complex with zinc hydroxide

In chemistry, tetradentate ligands (or quadridentate ligands) are ligands that bind four donor atoms to a central atom to form a coordination complex. This number of donor atoms that bind is called denticity and is a method of classifying ligands.

Tetradentate ligands are common in nature in the form of chlorophyll, which has a core ligand called chlorin, and heme, which has a core ligand called porphyrin. They are responsible for the colour observed in plants and humans. Phthalocyanine is an artificial macrocyclic tetradentate ligand that is used to make blue and green pigments.

== Shape ==
Tetradentate ligands can be classified by the topology of the connections between donor atoms. Common forms are linear (also called sequential), ring or tripodal. A tetrapodal ligand that is also tetradentate has four legs with donor atoms and a bridgehead that is not a donor. Upon binding with a central atom, there are several arrangements possible (known as geometric isomers).

=== Linear ligands ===
A linear tetradentate ligand has the four donor atoms in a line and each subsequent donor is connected by one of three bridges. Such a ligand bound to a metal in tetrahedral coordination can only connect in one way, though if the ligand is unsymmetrical then there are two chiral arrangements. A linear tetradentate ligand can also bind to a metal in square planar coordination in one way, where anticlockwise or clockwise arrangements are equivalent.

=== Linear ligands in octahedral coordination ===
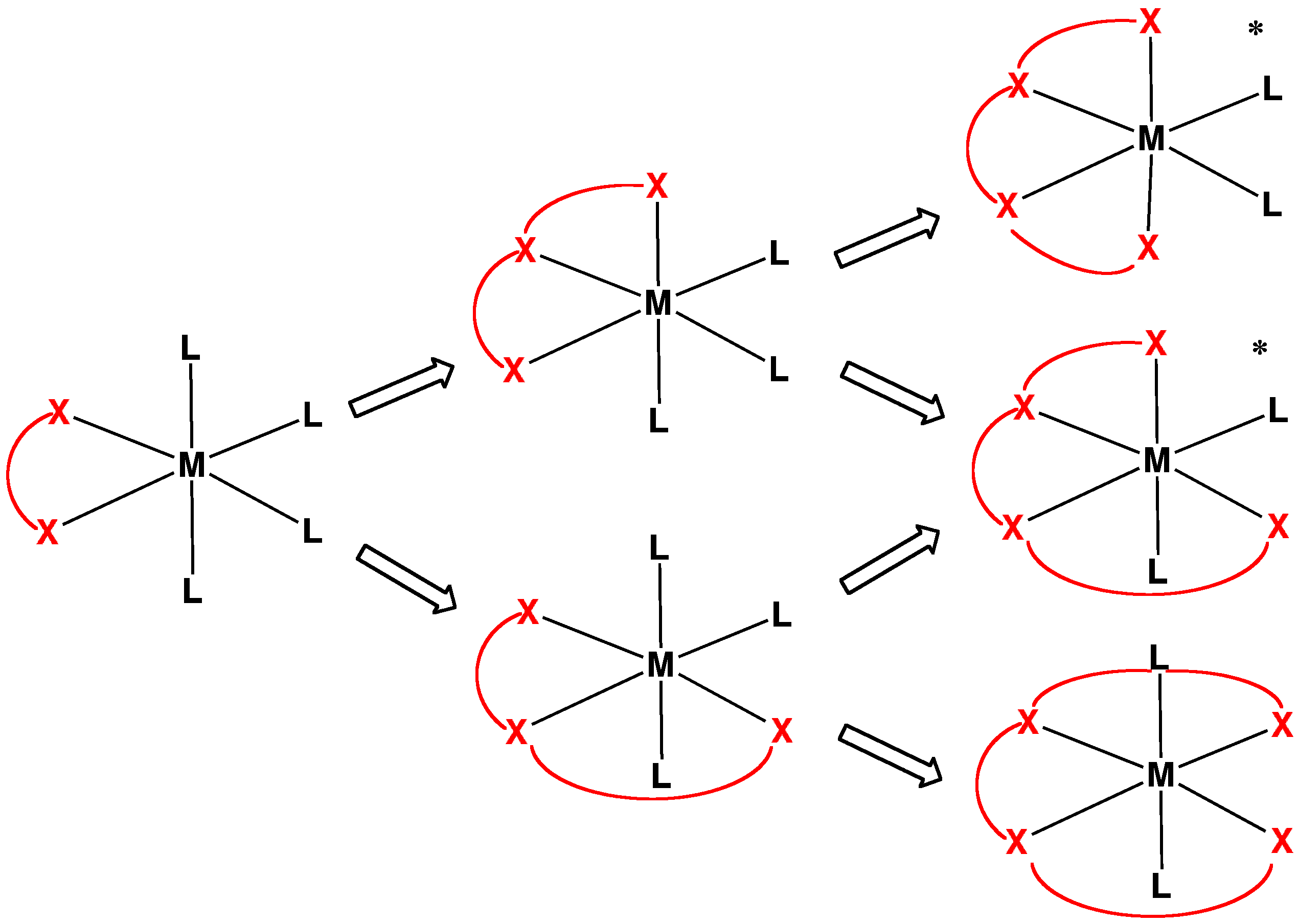
linear tetradentate ligand in three isomers in the right hand column. From top to bottom α, β, trans

A linear tetradentate ligand has its donor atoms arranged along or in a chain so that each adjacent donor atom has to be adjacent on the central atom. This arrangement leads to three stereochemical outcomes, and the four donor groups can be co-equatorial. This geometry is called trans because the remaining unoccupied positions on the octahedron are mutually trans (opposite). When the two internal donor atoms are pyramidal (such as the secondary amines in trien or EDDA), two diastereomers for the trans arrangement are determined by the relative stereochemistry of these centers. Typically these donors are mutually trans, resulting in a chiral complex of C_{2}-symmetric complexes. This arrangement is illustrated by complexes of the Trost ligand.

The ligand can bend so that one donor atom is at the pole and the remaining three are on the equator of the central atom. This is called cis-β (beta). The remaining octahedral positions are cis (adjacent) to each other. The triangles of coordinating atoms and the central atom have two coplanar atoms, and one perpendicular atom. This arrangement is chiral, so there are two possible mirror images. The arrangement where the chain goes down and clockwise is termed lambda, Λ, and where it goes down and anticlockwise is called delta, Δ. If the chain is not symmetrical, then different isomers can be produced by the end of the ligand that has the bend. If three donor atoms are the same at one end of the chain, the mer- and fac- prefixes used for tridentate ligands can be used. If the three donor atoms are arranged on a meridian, β-mer- is used; if the three donor atoms are arranged on the face of an octahedron, β-fac is used.

The chain can have two bends, with one donor at a pole, two on the equator and one at the opposite pole. None of the triangles of coordinating atoms and the central atom are coplanar. This is termed cis-alpha (α). This arrangement is chiral, so there are two possible mirror images. The arrangement where the chain goes down and clockwise and down is termed lambda, Λ, and where is goes down and anticlockwise and down is called delta (Δ).

=== Tripodal ligands ===
Tripodal tetradentate ligands have a donor atom connected via three chains to other donor atoms. The top of the tripod is called the apex, and a donor atom in that position is apical, or also known as the bridging atom. The other three donor atoms are on the "feet" of the tripod. Tripodal tetradentate ligands can have three identical chains attached to an atom (such as nitrogen, phosphorus, or arsenic) in tertiary arrangement. Molecules containing phosphorus, or arsenic donor atoms remain stiff at the P or As and can hold their shape, unlike nitrogen compounds which rapidly racemize. If all the feet of the tripod are symmetrical and identical to each other, there will be only one way to attach in an octahedral coordination. However, there are two non-equivalent positions left on the central atom, so if two different monodentate ligands or an unsymmetrical bidentate ligand attaches, there will be two possible isomers. If the feet differ, there are more isomers. When two feet are the same, and one is different there are three arrangements, two of which are enantiomers of each other. When there are three different legs, there are six possible isomers, but two are enantiomers of another pair and two are symmetric.

Atoms with five coordinate positions are usually trigonal bipyramidal or square pyramid geometry. A symmetric tripodal tetradentate ligand can form two isomers on a square pyramid, depending on whether the bridging donor is on the apex or the base of the pyramid. The extra vacant position on the square pyramid is on the base. Square pyramidal coordination tends to occur where a six-member ring is formed with the bridgehead, bridge, feet donor atom and central atom. The longer leg (with three bridging atoms) connects to the apex of the pyramid, and symmetry is lost.

For the trigonal bipyramid, the tripod shaped ligand has its most symmetrical position with the bridging donor at one of the apexes, and the feet of the tripod are arranged around the base, leaving a vacant position at the opposite apex, resulting in C_{3v} symmetry. Trigonal bipyramidal coordination tends to occur where five member rings are formed with the bridgehead, bridge, feet donor atoms and central atom.

In four coordination a tripodal ligand would fill all the positions available, the geometry is trigonal pyramid. The shape is distorted from the tetrahedron due to the non-symmetry of the tripod.

== Classification ==
In addition to shape, tetradentate ligands can be classified by the ligating atoms on the ligand. For linear ligands the order can be given. The ligand may have a negative charge when it is in a complex with the central atom. This may develop through the loss of hydrogen ions when the substance is dissolved.

One further characteristic is the size of the rings formed by the central metal with two donor atoms and the intervening chain of the ligand. Usually these rings have five or six members, but sometimes seven atoms. For ring shaped ligands, the total number of atoms in the ring is important, as it is a determiner of the hole size for the central atom. Each additional atom in the ring enlarges the hole radius from 0.1 to 0.15 Å.

Ligands are also characterized by charge. Tetradentate ligands can be neutral so that the charge of the whole complex is the same as the central atom. A tetradentate monoanionic (TMDA) ligand has one donor atom with a negative charge. A tetradentate dianionic ligand has a double negative charge, and tetradentate trianionic ligands have a triple negative charge. The maximal charge is on tetradentate tetraanionic ligands, which can stabilize metals in high oxidation states, however such ligands also have to resist oxidation by the highly oxidizing metal centre.

== List ==
| name | abbreviation | formula | shape | type | charge | MW | central atoms | pic |
|---|---|---|---|---|---|---|---|---|
| Chlorin | | | ring | NNNN | –2 | 312.3678 | Mg | |
| Corrin | | | ring | NNNN | –1 | 306.40 | Co | |
| 1,4,7,10-tetraoxacyclododecane | 12-crown-4 | (C_{2}H_{4}O)_{4} | ring | OOOO | 0 | 176.21 | Li | |
| 1,4,8,11-tetraazacyclotetradecane | cyclam | (NHCH_{2}CH_{2}NHCH_{2}CH_{2}CH_{2})_{2} | ring | NNNN | | 200.33 | transition metals | |
| 1,4,7,10-tetraazacyclododecane | cyclen | | ring | N_{4} | | 172.271 | Zn | |
| Dibenzotetramethyltetraaza[14]annulene | tmtaa | | ring | NNNN | 2- | | UO_{2} | |
| N,N-ethylenediaminediacetic acid | | NH_{2}C_{2}H_{4}N(CH_{2}COOH)_{2} | tripodal | NNO_{2} | 2– | | | |
| N,N'-ethylenediaminediacetic acid | | (-CH_{2}NHCH_{2}COOH)_{2} | linear | ONNO | 2– | | | |
| N-hydroxyimino-2,2'-dipropionic acid | H_{3}HIDPA | HON(CH(CH_{3})CO_{2}H)_{2} | linear | ONOO | 3– | | V^{4+} | |
| diethylenetriamineacetic acid | DTMA | NH_{2}C_{2}H_{4}NHC_{2}H_{4}NHCH_{2}COOH | linear | NNNO | 1– | | Co | |
| iso-diethylenetriamineacetic acid | i-DTMA | (NH_{2}C_{2}H_{4})_{2}NCH_{2}COOH | tripodal | N_{N}2NO | 1– | | Co | |
| Jäger's N2O2 ligand | | | linear acacen | ONNO N_{2}O_{2} | | | Ni | |
| Naphthalocyanine | | C_{48}H_{26}N_{8} | ring | NNNN | | 714.79 | | |
| Nitrilotriacetic acid | NTA | N(CH_{2}CO_{2}H)_{3} | tripodal | NO_{3} | 3– | 191.14 | Ca^{2+}, Cr, Cu^{2+}, and Fe^{3+}, Ni | |
| Phthalocyanine | H_{2}Pc | C_{32}H_{18}N_{8} | ring | NNNN | 2– | | Cu, Co | |
| Porphyrin | | | ring | NNNN | | | Mg, V, Fe, Ni | |
| Rhodotorulic acid | | C_{14}H_{24}N_{4}O_{6} | I shape | OOOO | | 344.36 | Fe^{3+} | |
| Salen ligand | | | linear | ONNO N_{2}O_{2} | | 268.31 | | |
| salpn ligand | salpn | | linear | ONNO | 2− | 282.34 | Cr, Cu, Fe, Ni | |
| | tetars (meso and racemic isomers) | [(CH_{3})_{2}As(CH2)_{3}As(C_{6}H_{5})CH_{2}]_{2} | linear | AsAsAsAs | 0 | | Co^{2+} | |
| 1,1,4,7,10,10-hexaphenyl-1,4,7,10-tetraphosphadecane tetraphos | tet-1 | | linear | PPPP | 0 | 670.68 | Fe^{+} Ru^{+} Os^{+} Re^{3+} Pd^{2+} Pt^{2+} | |
| 1,4,7,10-tetrathiadodecane | [12]-ane-S_{4} | | ring | SSSS | 0 | | Cu^{2+} | |
| 1,4,7,10-tetrathiatridecane | [13]-ane-S_{4} | | ring | SSSS | 0 | | Cu^{2+} | |
| 1,4,8,11-tetrathiatetradecane | [14]-ane-S_{4} | | ring | SSSS | 0 | | Cu^{2+} | |
| 1,4,8,12-tetrathiapentadecane | [15]-ane-S_{4} | | ring | SSSS | 0 | | Cu^{2+} | |
| 1,5,9,13-tetrathiahexadecane | [14]-ane-S_{4} | | ring | SSSS | 0 | | Cu^{2+} | |
| 2,5,8-trithia[9](2,5)thiophenophane | | | ring | SSSS | 0 | | Cu^{2+} | |
| Triethylene glycol dimethyl ether | TG3 | CH_{3}(OCH_{2}CH_{2})_{3}OCH_{3} | linear | OOOO | 0 | 178.23 | neutral Na, K | |
| Triethylenetetramine | TETA trien | [CH_{2}NHCH_{2}CH_{2}NH_{2}]_{2} | linear | NNNN | | 146.24 | Cu^{2+} | |
| tris-(dimethylarsinopropyl)-arsine | | As[CH_{2}CH_{2}CH_{2}As(CH_{3})_{2}]_{3} | tripod | AsAs_{3} | 0 | | Fe^{2+} Ni^{2+} Co^{3+} oct Ni^{3+} tbp | |
| tris-(o-dimethylarsinophenyl)-arsine | | As[o-C_{6}H_{4}As(CH_{3})_{2}]_{3} | tripod | AsAs_{3} | 0 | | Pt^{2+} Pd^{2+} Ni^{2+} tbp Ru^{2+} oct | |
| tris-(o-diphenylarsinophenyl)-arsine | | As[o-C_{6}H_{4}As(C_{6}H_{5})_{2}]_{3} | tripod | AsAs_{3} | 0 | | Pt^{2+} Pd^{2+} Ru^{0} Rh^{+} Ni^{2+} tbp Re^{2+} Ru^{2+} Os^{2+} Rh^{3+} Pd^{4+} Pt^{4+} oct | |
| | | CH_{3}[As(CH_{3})o-C_{6}H_{4}]_{3}AsCH(_{3})_{2} | linear | As_{4} | 0 | | Pd^{2+} square pyramydal | |
| | | [As(C_{6}H_{5})_{2}o-C_{6}H_{4}As(C_{6}H_{5})CH_{2}]_{2} | linear | As_{4} | 0 | | Ni^{2+} 4 coordinate Ni^{2+} Co^{2+} five coordinate | |
| tris-(o-diphenylphosphinophenyl)-phosphine | tripod tetraphosphine of Venanzi | P[o-C_{6}H_{4}P(C_{6}H_{5})_{2}]_{3} | tripod | PP_{3} | 0 | | Pd^{2+} Pt^{2+} Ru^{0} Ru^{2+} Os^{2+} Cr^{0} Cr^{+} Cr^{3+} Mn^{+} Co^{3+} oct Ni^{2+} Fe^{2+} Co^{+} Co^{2+} tbp | |
| Tris(2-pyridylmethyl)amine | TPA | | tripodal | NN_{3} | | 290.37 | Cu | |
| 2,2′-bi-1,10-phenanthroline | BIPHEN | | linear | N_{4} | 0 | | Cd Sm Am | |
| Quaterpyridine | qtpy | | linear | N_{4} | 0 | | | |

== Biomolecules ==
Heme is a heterocyclic macrocycle ring shaped tetradentate ligand. It is an important molecule in red blood cells.

Chlorophyll comes in several forms and is important in plant photosynthesis. Bacteria may use variants called bacteriochlorophylls.
