= Aminopolycarboxylic acid =

a metal complex with the EDTA anion

Aspartic acid is an aminodicarboxylic acid and precursor to other ligands.

An aminopolycarboxylic acid (sometimes abbreviated APCA) is a chemical compound containing one or more nitrogen atoms connected through carbon atoms to two or more carboxyl groups. Upon deprotonation of their carboxylic acids, aminopolycarboxylates form strong complexes with metal ions. This property makes aminopolycarboxylic acids a useful complexone in a wide variety of chemical, medical, and environmental applications. Some such ligands produced on a large commercial scale include EDTA and NTA.

== Structure ==
This family of ligands is often derived, structurally at least, from the amino acid glycine, H_{2}NCH_{2}COOH, in which the amino group, NH_{2}, is separated from the carboxyl group, COOH, by a single methylene group, CH_{2}. When the carboxyl group is deprotonated, the glycinate ion can function as a bidentate ligand, binding the metal centre through the nitrogen and one of two carboxylate oxygen atoms, to form chelate complexes of metal ions.

Replacement of a hydrogen atom on the nitrogen of glycine by another acetate residue, −CH_{2}COOH, gives iminodiacetic acid, IDA, which is a tridentate ligand. Further substitution gives nitrilotriacetic acid, NTA, which is a tetradentate ligand. These compounds can be described as aminopolycarboxylates. Related ligands can be derived from other amino acids other than glycine, notably aspartic acid.

Binding of a metal complex by the iminodiacetate anion

Higher density is achieved by linking two or more glycinate or IDA units together. EDTA contains two IDA units with the nitrogen atoms linked by two methylene groups and is hexadentate. DTPA has two CH_{2}CH_{2} bridges linking three nitrogen atoms and is octadentate. TTHA has ten potential donor atoms.

== Applications ==
The chelating properties of aminopolycarboxylates can be engineered by varying the groups linking the nitrogen atoms so as to increase selectivity for a particular metal ion. The number of carbon atoms between the nitrogen and carboxyl group can also be varied and substituents can be placed on these carbon atoms. Altogether this allows for a vast range of possibilities. Fura-2 combines two functionalities: it has high selectivity for calcium over magnesium and it has a substituent which makes the complex fluorescent when it binds calcium. This reagent provides a means of determining the calcium content in intra-cellular fluid. Details concerning applications of the following examples can be found in the individual articles and/or reference. The aminopolycarboxylate nicotianamine is widespread in plants, where it is used to transport iron.

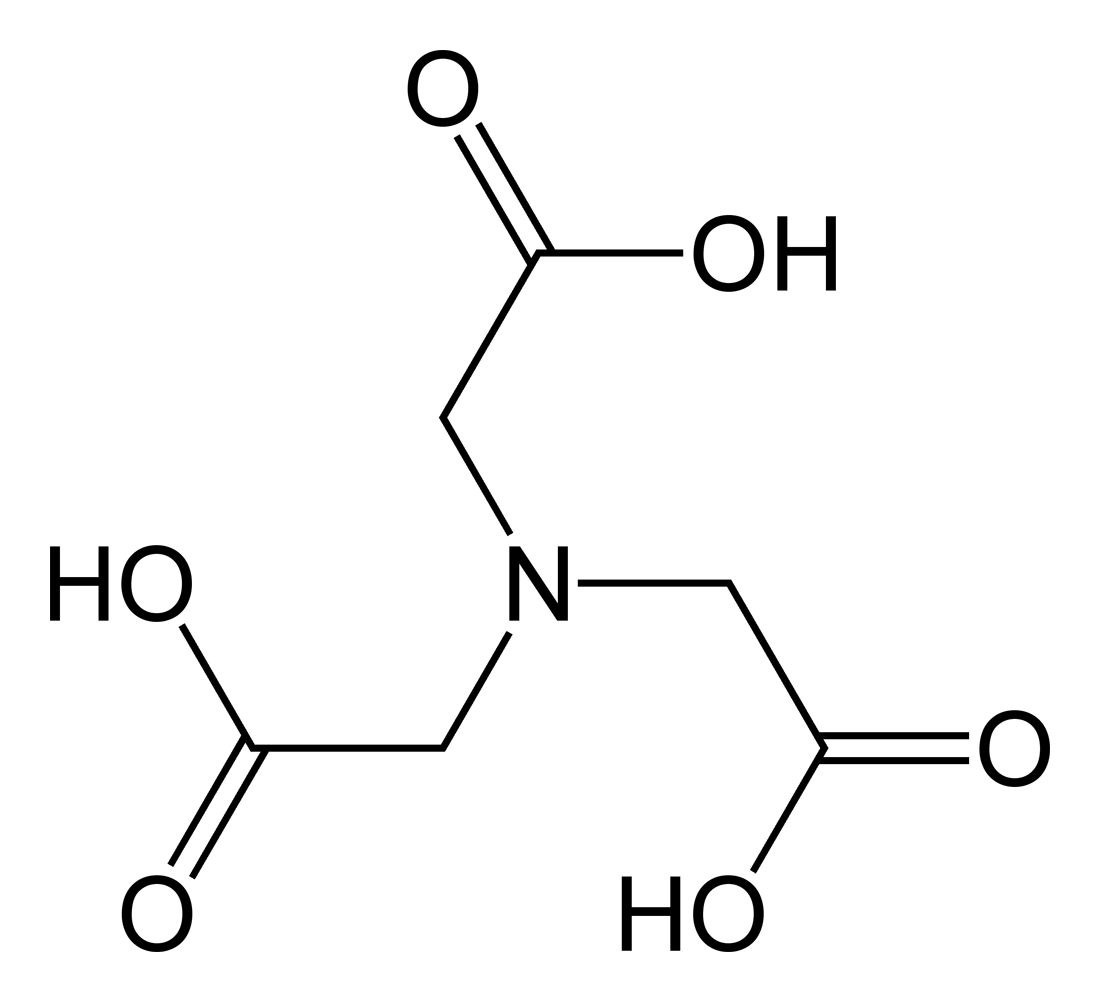

glycinate
IDA
NTA
EDDA
EDTA
EDDS
DTPA
EGTA
BAPTA
NOTA
DOTA
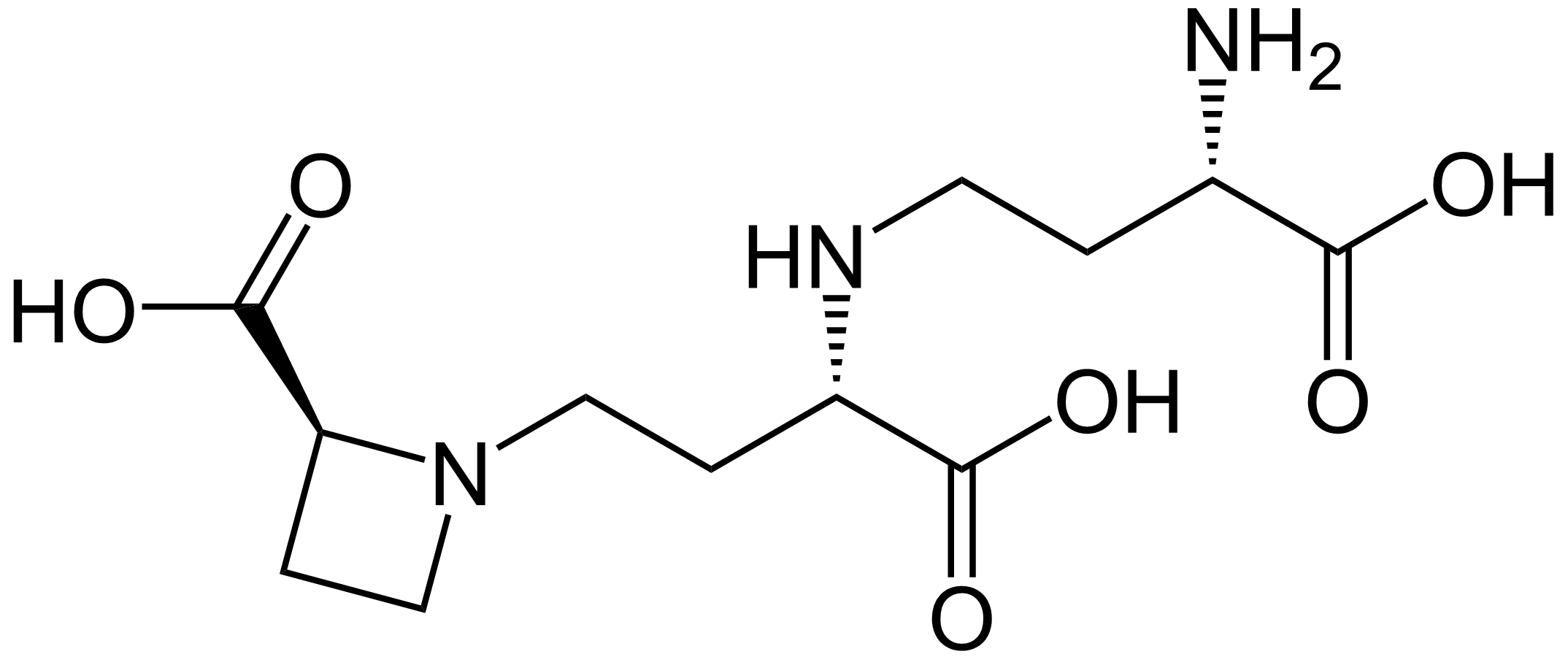
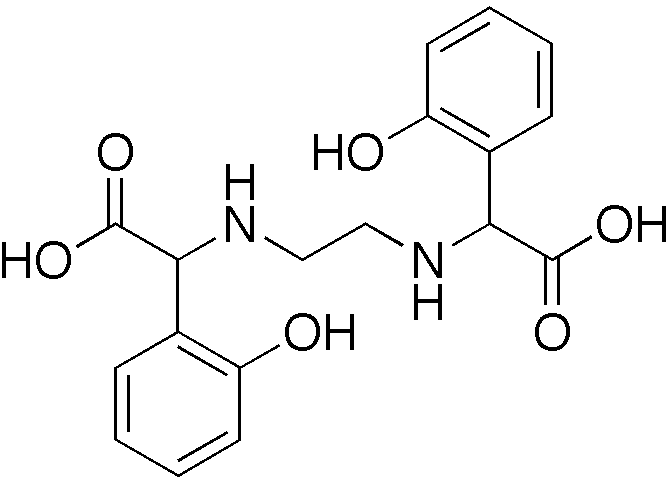
Nicotianamine
EDDHA
Diaminocyclohexanetetraacetic acid

== Environmental aspects ==
Because some aminopolycarboxylic acids are released in large quantities into the environment, their slow biodegradation has raised concern, and has motivated the redesign of some of these ligands.

== See also ==
- Polycarboxylates
