= Bucillamine =

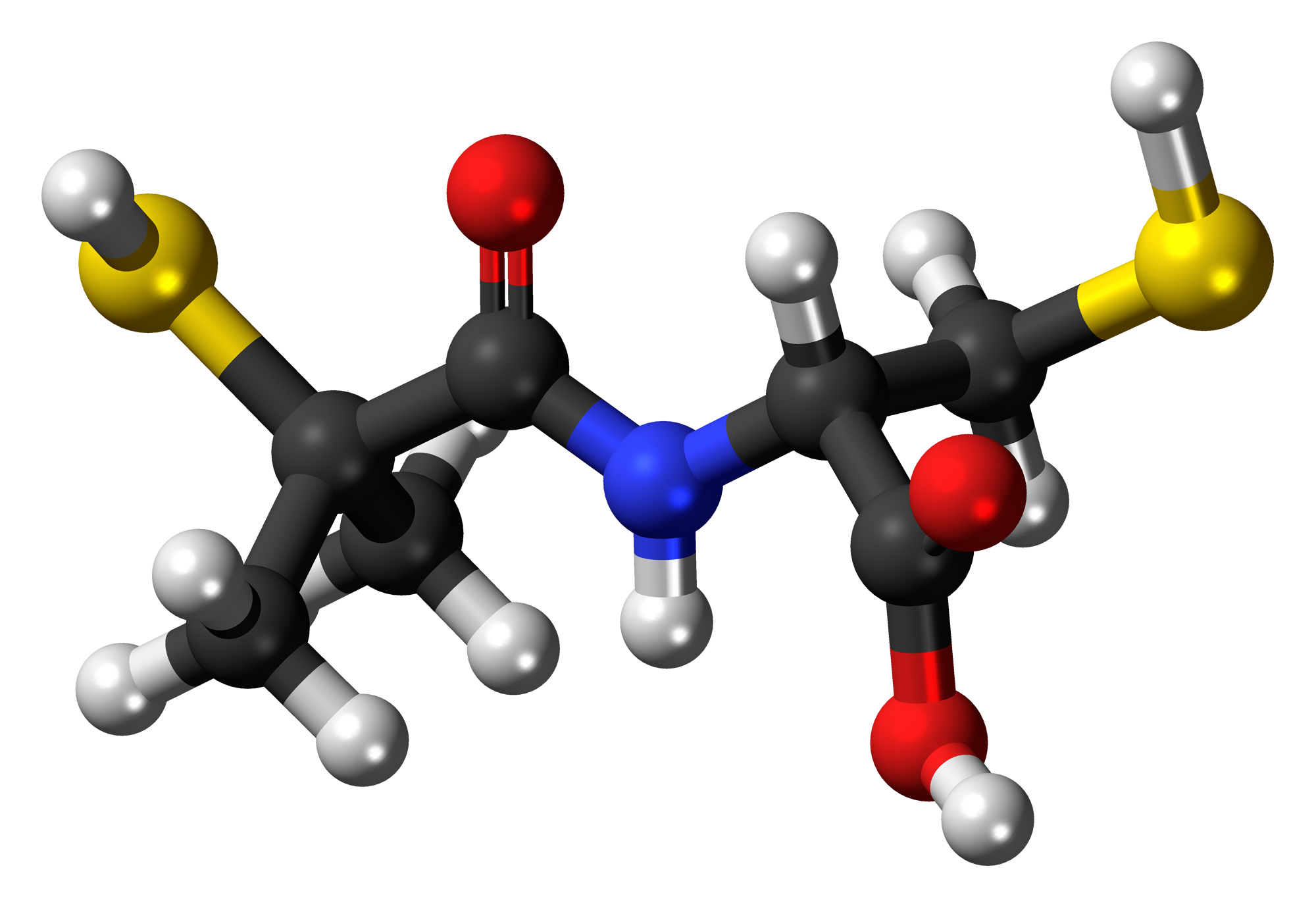

Names
- IUPAC name 2-[(2-Methyl-2-sulfanylpropanoyl)amino]-3-sulfanylpropanoic acid

Identifiers
CAS Number	65002-17-7 R
3D model (JSmol)	Interactive image
ChEMBL	ChEMBL80830
ChemSpider	2365
KEGG	D01809
MeSH	bucillamine
PubChem CID	2459; 656604 R; 636373 S
UNII	R80LRA5WTF
CompTox Dashboard (EPA)	DTXSID2048587
- InChI: InChI=1S/C7H13NO3S2/c1-7(2,13)6(11)8-4(3-12)5(9)10/h4,12-13H,3H2,1-2H3,(H,8,11)(H,9,10) Key: VUAFHZCUKUDDBC-UHFFFAOYSA-N
- SMILES: CC(C)(S)C(=O)NC(CS)C(=O)O

Properties
Chemical formula	C_{7}H_{13}NO_{3}S_{2}
Molar mass	223.31 g·mol^{−1}
log P	1.032
Acidity (pK_{a})	3.012
Basicity (pK_{b})	10.985

Pharmacology
ATC code	M01CC02 (WHO)

Related compounds
Related Alkanoic acids	Acetylcysteine; Glycylglycine; Iminodiacetic acid; Nitrilotriacetic acid; N-Oxalylglycine; Tiopronin; Oxalyldiaminopropionic acid; gamma-Glutamylcysteine
Related compounds	N-Acetylglycinamide
- Except where otherwise noted, data are given for materials in their standard state (at 25 °C [77 °F], 100 kPa). Infobox references

Bucillamine is an antirheumatic agent developed from tiopronin. Activity is mediated by the two thiol groups that the molecule contains. Research done in USA showed positive transplant preservation properties. Bucillamine is currently being investigated for COVID-19 drug repurposing.

Bucillamine has a well-known safety profile and is prescribed in the treatment of rheumatoid arthritis in Japan and South Korea for over 30 years. It is a cysteine derivative with 2 thiol groups that is 16-fold more potent than acetylcysteine (NAC) as a thiol donor in vivo, giving it vastly superior function in restoring glutathione and therefore greater potential to prevent acute lung injury during influenza infection. Bucillamine has also been shown to prevent oxidative and reperfusion injury in heart and liver tissues.

Bucillamine has both proven safety and proven mechanism of action similar to that of NAC, but with much higher potency, mitigating the previous obstacles to using thiols therapeutically. It is hypothesized that similar processes related to reactive oxygen species (ROS) are involved in acute lung injury during nCov-19 infection, possibly justifying the investigation of bucillamine as an intervention for COVID-19.

On July 31, 2020, the U.S. Food & Drug Administration (FDA) has approved Revive Therapeutics Ltd. to proceed with a randomized, double-blind, placebo-controlled confirmatory Phase 3 clinical trial protocol to evaluate the safety and efficacy of Bucillamine in patients with mild-moderate COVID-19.
