= Nitrilotriacetate monooxygenase =

Identifiers
- EC no.: 1.14.14.10

Databases
- IntEnz: IntEnz view
- BRENDA: BRENDA entry
- ExPASy: NiceZyme view
- KEGG: KEGG entry
- MetaCyc: metabolic pathway
- PRIAM: profile
- PDB structures: RCSB PDB PDBe PDBsum
Search
- PMC: articles
- PubMed: articles
- NCBI: proteins

Nitrilotriacetate monooxygenase (EC 1.14.14.10) is an enzyme with systematic name nitrilotriacetate,FMNH_{2}:oxygen oxidoreductase (glyoxylate-forming). This enzyme catalyses the following chemical reaction

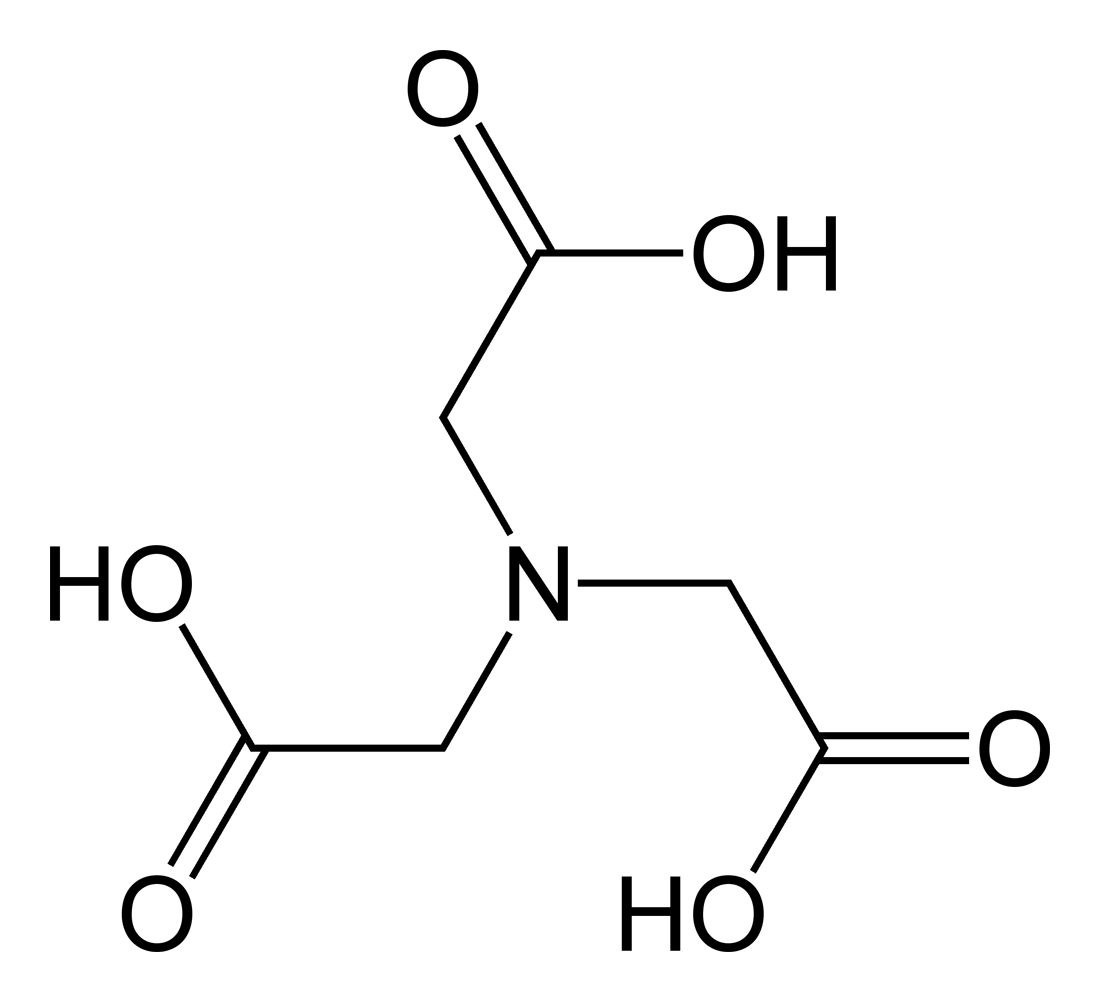
nitrilotriacetic acid
+ FADH_{2}
O_{2}
H_{2}O
iminodiacetic acid
+ FAD +
glyoxylic acid

The three substrates of this enzyme are nitrilotriacetic acid, reduced flavin adenine dinucleotide (FADH_{2}), and oxygen. It products are iminodiacetic acid, FAD, glyoxylic acid, and water. It requires Mg^{2+}.
