= Diglycine =

Diglycine may refer to:

- Glycylglycine, dipeptide of glycine
- Iminodiacetic acid, an acid
