= Hida =

Hida may refer to:

== Places ==
- Hida Province, a former province in Japan
- Hida, Gifu, a city in Gifu Prefecture, Japan
- Hida (region), the northern region of Gifu Prefecture, Japan
- Hida, Sălaj, a commune in Romania
- Hida Minzoku Mura Folk Village, an open air historical museum in Gifu Prefecture, Japan

== Transport ==
- Hida (train), a train service in Japan
- JCG Hida class patrol vessel - a class of patrol vessel of the Japan Coast Guard

== Acronyms ==
- Hydroxy iminodiacetic acid, abbreviated as HIDA
- HIDA scan, cholescintigraphy using hepatobiliary iminodiacetic acid

== Other uses ==
- Chaim Yosef David Azulai (1724 -1806), rabbinical scholar commonly known as Hida
- Hida (surname), a Japanese surname
- Hebrew acronym for Rabbi Chaim Joseph David Azulai
