= C5H9NO3S =

The molecular formula C_{5}H_{9}NO_{3}S (molar mass: 163.195 g/mol, exact mass: 163.0303 u) may refer to:

- Acetylcysteine, also known as N-acetylcysteine (NAC)
- Tiopronin
