= Tiopronin =

- Skeletal formula of tiopronin

Names
- IUPAC name N-(2-Sulfanylpropanoyl)glycine
- Systematic IUPAC name (2-Sulfanylpropanamido)acetic acid
- Other names 2-mercaptopropionylglycine Acadione, Thiola

Identifiers
CAS Number	1953-02-2; 29335-92-0 R
3D model (JSmol)	Interactive image
Beilstein Reference	1859822
ChEBI	CHEBI:32229
ChEMBL	ChEMBL1314
ChemSpider	5283; 180938 R; 643292 S
DrugBank	DB06823
ECHA InfoCard	100.016.163
EC Number	217-778-4
KEGG	D01430
MeSH	Tiopronin
PubChem CID	5483; 208825 R; 736152 S
RTECS number	MC0596500
UNII	C5W04GO61S; X294K8K2PF R
CompTox Dashboard (EPA)	DTXSID4023678
- InChI: InChI=1S/C5H9NO3S/c1-3(10)5(9)6-2-4(7)8/h3,10H,2H2,1H3,(H,6,9)(H,7,8) Key: YTGJWQPHMWSCST-UHFFFAOYSA-N
- SMILES: CC(S)C(=O)NCC(O)=O

Properties
Chemical formula	C_{5}H_{9}NO_{3}S
Molar mass	163.19 g·mol^{−1}
Appearance	White, opaque crystals
Melting point	93 to 98 °C (199 to 208 °F; 366 to 371 K)
log P	−0.674
Acidity (pK_{a})	3.356
Basicity (pK_{b})	10.641

Pharmacology
ATC code	G04BX16 (WHO) QG04BX16 (WHO)
Routes of administration	By mouth
Legal status	US: ℞-only

Hazards
- GHS labelling
Pictograms	(GHS07: Exclamation mark)
Signal word	Warning
Hazard statements	H302
- Lethal dose or concentration (LD, LC)
LD_{50} (median dose)	1,300 mg kg^{−1} (oral, rat)

Related compounds
Related alkanoic acids	Acetylcysteine; Glycylglycine; Iminodiacetic acid; Nitrilotriacetic acid; N-Oxalylglycine; Bucillamine; Oxalyldiaminopropionic acid; gamma-Glutamylcysteine
Related compounds	N-Acetylglycinamide
- Except where otherwise noted, data are given for materials in their standard state (at 25 °C [77 °F], 100 kPa). Infobox references

Tiopronin
Clinical data
- License data: US DailyMed: Tiopronin

Identifiers
- CompTox Dashboard (EPA): DTXSID4023678
- ECHA InfoCard: 100.016.163

Tiopronin, sold under the brand name Thiola among others, is a medication used to control the rate of cystine precipitation and excretion in the disease cystinuria.

It is available as a generic medication.

== Medical uses ==
Tiopronin is indicated, in combination with high fluid intake, alkali, and diet modification, for the prevention of cystine stone formation in people 20 kilograms (44 lb) and greater with severe homozygous cystinuria, who are not responsive to these measures alone.

== Side effects ==
Tiopronin may present a variety of side effects, which are broadly similar to those of D-penicillamine and other compounds containing active sulfhydryl groups. Its pharmacokinetics have been studied.

== Pharmacology ==
=== Mechanism of action ===
Tiopronin works by reacting with urinary cysteine to form a more soluble, disulfide linked, tiopronin-cysteine complex.

== Society and culture ==
In the US, tiopronin was sold by Mission Pharmacal at $1.50 per pill, but in 2014, the rights were bought by Retrophin, owned by Martin Shkreli, and the price increased to $30 per pill for a 100 mg capsule.

In 2016 Imprimis Pharmaceuticals introduced a lower cost version sold as a compounded medication.

== Research ==
It may be used for Wilson's disease (an overload of copper in the body), and has also been investigated for the treatment of arthritis, though tiopronin is not an anti-inflammatory.

Tiopronin may be used as a stabilizing agent for metal nanoparticles. The thiol group binds to the nanoparticles, preventing coagulation.
