= C5H9NO4 =

The molecular formula C_{5}H_{9}NO_{4} (molar mass 147.13 g/mol, exact mass: 147.0532 u) may refer to:

- O-Acetylserine, an α-amino acid
- Glutamic acid, a proteinogenic amino acid
- N-Methyl-D-aspartic acid, a specific agonist at the NMDA receptor
- L-threo-3-Methylaspartate
- N-Methyliminodiacetic acid
