= Glycylglycine =

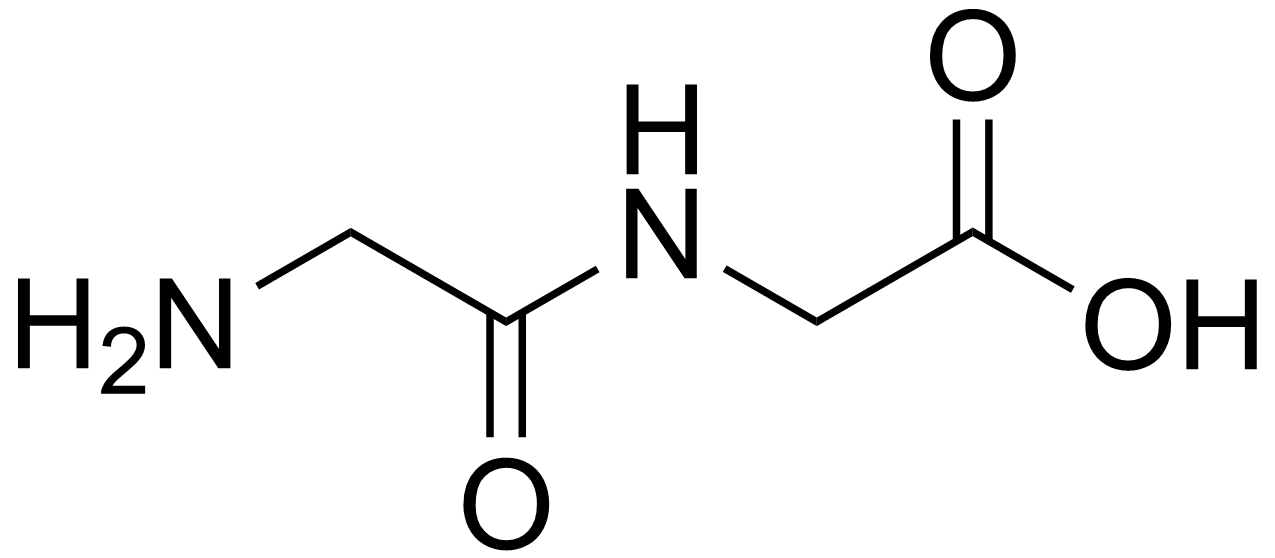
- Skeletal formula of glycylglycine

Names
- IUPAC name Glycylglycine
- Systematic IUPAC name (2-Aminoacetamido)acetic acid
- Other names: Diglycine; Diglycocoll; Glycine dipeptide; Glycyl-glycine; N-Glycylglycine

Identifiers
CAS Number	556-50-3
3D model (JSmol)	Interactive image
Abbreviations	Gly-Gly
Beilstein Reference	1765223
ChEBI	CHEBI:17201
ChEMBL	ChEMBL292467
ChemSpider	10690
ECHA InfoCard	100.008.299
EC Number	209-127-8
Gmelin Reference	82735
KEGG	C02037
MeSH	Glycylglycine
PubChem CID	11163
UNII	10525P22U0
CompTox Dashboard (EPA)	DTXSID90862194
- InChI: InChI=1S/C4H8N2O3/c5-1-3(7)6-2-4(8)9/h1-2,5H2,(H,6,7)(H,8,9) Key: YMAWOPBAYDPSLA-UHFFFAOYSA-N
- SMILES: NCC(=O)NCC(O)=O

Properties
Chemical formula	C_{4}H_{8}N_{2}O_{3}
Molar mass	132.119 g·mol^{−1}
Appearance	White crystals
Solubility in water	132 g L^{−1} (at 20 °C)
log P	−2.291
Acidity (pK_{a})	3.133
Basicity (pK_{b})	10.864
UV-vis (λ_{max})	260 nm
Absorbance	0.075

Thermochemistry
Heat capacity (C)	163.97 J K^{−1} mol^{−1}
Std molar entropy (S^{⦵}_{298})	180.3 J K^{−1} mol^{−1}
Std enthalpy of formation (Δ_{f}H^{⦵}_{298})	−749.0 to −746.4 kJ mol^{−1}
Std enthalpy of combustion (Δ_{c}H^{⦵}_{298})	−1.9710 to −1.9684 MJ mol^{−1}

Hazards
- GHS labelling
Pictograms	(GHS07: Exclamation mark)
Signal word	Warning
Hazard statements	H319
Precautionary statements	P305+P351+P338

Related compounds
Related alkanoic acids	Acetylcysteine; Iminodiacetic acid; Nitrilotriacetic acid; N-Oxalylglycine; Tiopronin; Bucillamine; Oxalyldiaminopropionic acid
Related compounds	N-Acetylglycinamide
- Except where otherwise noted, data are given for materials in their standard state (at 25 °C [77 °F], 100 kPa). Infobox references

Glycylglycine is the dipeptide of glycine, making it the simplest peptide. The compound was first synthesized by Emil Fischer and Ernest Fourneau in 1901 by boiling 2,5-diketopiperazine (glycine anhydride) with hydrochloric acid. Shaking with alkali and other synthesis methods have been reported. There is an enzyme, 2,5-dioxopiperazine hydrolase, which specifically carries out this reaction.

Because of its low toxicity, it is useful as a buffer for biological systems with effective ranges between pH 2.5–3.8 and 7.5–8.9; however, it is only moderately stable for storage once dissolved. It is used in the synthesis of more complex peptides.

Glycylglycine has also been reported to be helpful in solubilizing recombinant proteins in E. coli. Using different concentrations of the glycylglycine improvement in protein solubility after cell lysis has been observed.

== See also ==
- DT-109
