= N-Methyliminodiacetic acid =

Names
- Other names N-(Carboxymethyl)-N-methyl-glycine

Identifiers
CAS Number	4408-64-4
3D model (JSmol)	Interactive image
ChEMBL	ChEMBL1741474
ChemSpider	19251
ECHA InfoCard	100.022.326
EC Number	224-557-6
PubChem CID	20441
UNII	SH1YP5H4NA
CompTox Dashboard (EPA)	DTXSID00196033
- InChI: InChI=1S/C5H9NO4/c1-6(2-4(7)8)3-5(9)10/h2-3H2,1H3,(H,7,8)(H,9,10) Key: XWSGEVNYFYKXCP-UHFFFAOYSA-N
- SMILES: CN(CC(=O)O)CC(=O)O

Properties
Chemical formula	C_{5}H_{9}NO_{4}
Molar mass	147.130 g·mol^{−1}
Appearance	white solid
Melting point	223–225 °C (433–437 °F; 496–498 K)

Hazards
- GHS labelling
Pictograms	(GHS07: Exclamation mark)
Signal word	Warning
Hazard statements	H315, H319, H335
Precautionary statements	P261, P264, P264+P265, P271, P280, P302+P352, P304+P340, P305+P351+P338, P319, P321, P332+P317, P337+P317, P362+P364, P403+P233, P405, P501
- Except where otherwise noted, data are given for materials in their standard state (at 25 °C [77 °F], 100 kPa). Infobox references

N-Methyliminodiacetic acid is an organic compound with the formula CH_{3}N(CH_{2}CO_{2}H)_{2}. It is a white solid, which as its conjugate base CH_{3}N(CH_{2}CO^{−}_{2})_{2} is used as a chelating agent for iron. It is a component of organoboron reagents as well.

== Synthesis and reaction ==
It is prepared from imidodiacetic acid by N-methylation using the Eschweiler–Clarke reaction:

MIDA boronates are derivatives with the formula CH_{3}N(CH_{2}CO_{2})_{2}BR, where R is a cross-coupling partner.

== Related compounds ==
- Imidodiacetic acid (IDA)
- N-(2-Carboxyethyl)iminodiacetic acid
- Nitrilotriacetic acid (NTA)
- N-Hydroxyiminodiacetic acid (HIDA), HON(CH_{2}CO_{2}H)_{2} (registry number = 87339–38–6). See HIDA scan.
