= Pyrimethamine/dapsone =

Combination drug

Combination of
- Pyrimethamine: Antimalarial
- Dapsone: Antimicrobial

Clinical data
- Trade names: Maloprim

Pyrimethamine/dapsone, sold under the brand name Maloprim, is a combination medication used to treat malaria and pneumocystis jiroveci pneumonia. It contains a combination of pyrimethamine (Daraprim), an antimalarial, and dapsone, a sulfone. It is especially useful for preventing reactivation of latent infections in immunocompromised adults. However, its use is limited by the possibility of hematologic toxicity.
