= C4H7NO4 =

The molecular formula C_{4}H_{7}NO_{4} (molar mass: 133.10 g/mol, exact mass: 133.0375 u) may refer to:

- Iminodiacetic acid (IDA)
- Aspartic acid (Asp or D)
