= N-Acetylglycinamide =

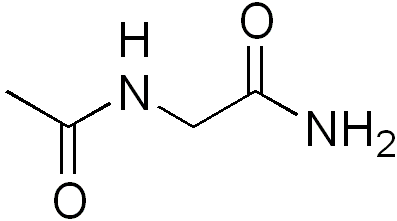
- Structural formula of N-acetylglycinamide

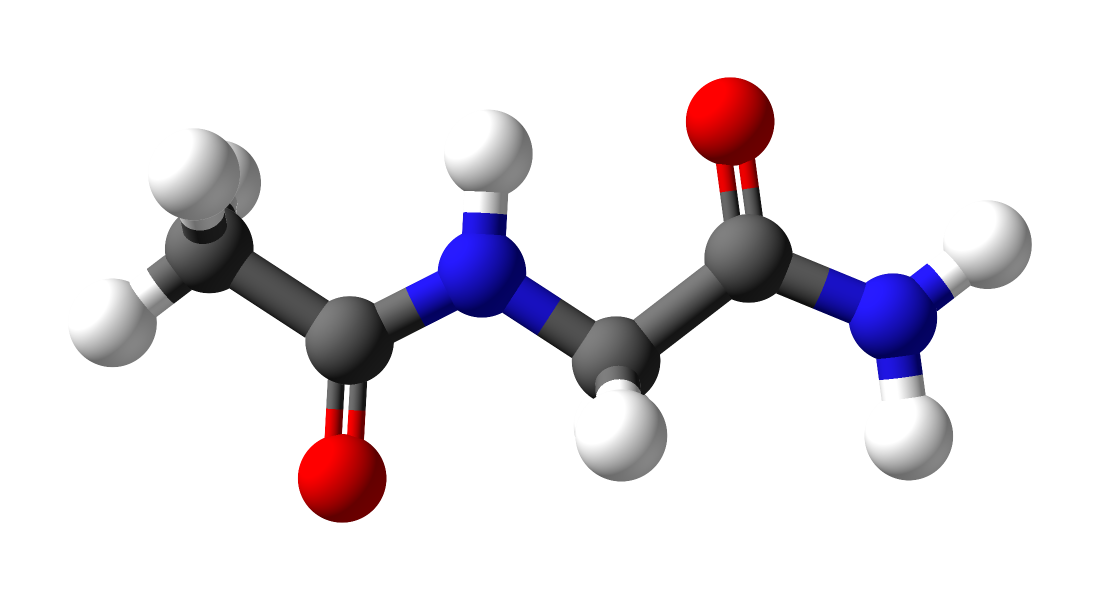

Names
- IUPAC name N^{2}-Acetylglycinamide
- Systematic IUPAC name 2-Acetamidoacetamide
- Other names N-Acetyl-2-aminoacetamide

Identifiers
CAS Number	2620-63-5
3D model (JSmol)	Interactive image
ChemSpider	26351
ECHA InfoCard	100.018.236
EC Number	220-058-2
MeSH	N-acetylglycinamide
PubChem CID	28326
UNII	97SV9AFW2Z
CompTox Dashboard (EPA)	DTXSID701031047 DTXSID10274851, DTXSID701031047
- InChI: InChI=1S/C4H8N2O2/c1-3(7)6-2-4(5)8/h2H2,1H3,(H2,5,8)(H,6,7) Key: WQELDIQOHGAHEM-UHFFFAOYSA-N
- SMILES: CC(=O)NCC(N)=O

Properties
Chemical formula	C_{4}H_{8}N_{2}O_{2}
Molar mass	116.120 g·mol^{−1}
Appearance	White crystals
Odor	Odourless
Melting point	140 to 143 °C (284 to 289 °F; 413 to 416 K)

Hazards
- GHS labelling
Pictograms	(GHS07: Exclamation mark)
Signal word	Warning
Hazard statements	H315, H319, H335
Precautionary statements	P261, P305+P351+P338

Related compounds
Related compounds	Acetylcysteine; Glycylglycine; Iminodiacetic acid; Nitrilotriacetic acid; N-Oxalylglycine; Tiopronin; Bucillamine; Oxalyldiaminopropionic acid
- Except where otherwise noted, data are given for materials in their standard state (at 25 °C [77 °F], 100 kPa). verify (what is ?) Infobox references

N-Acetylglycinamide is a glycine derivative.

== See also ==
- Acetylglycinamide chloral hydrate
- N-Acetylglycine
