= Harrow, Inc. =

American pharmaceutical company

Harrow Health, Inc.
- Formerly: Imprimis Pharmaceuticals ( - Jan 2019)
- Type: Public
- Traded as: Nasdaq: HROW; Russell Microcap Index component
- Industry: Pharmaceutical Industry
- Founded: 2012; 14 years ago
- Headquarters: Nashville, Tennessee, United States
- Number of locations: 1 (Nashville, TN)
- Key people: Mark L. Baum (CEO); Andrew R. Boll (CFO)
- Products: Pharmaceuticals
- Subsidiaries: ImprimisRx; Eton Pharmaceuticals; Surface Pharmaceuticals; Melt Pharmaceuticals; Visionology.com
- Website: www.harrow.com

Harrow Health, Inc., formerly known as Imprimis Pharmaceuticals, is a publicly traded pharmaceutical company based in Nashville, Tennessee.

Since 2014, Harrow has started six healthcare businesses, including ImprimisRx, an ophthalmic-focused pharmaceutical company. In 2017, Harrow started and funded Eton Pharmaceuticals with a $20 million Series A financing, and Eton is now a publicly traded company. In 2017, Harrow started Surface Pharmaceuticals, hiring Dr. Kamran Hosseini to be its chief executive officer. Surface was funded with a $20 million Series A financing with Flying L Partners leading the round. In 2018, Harrow started Melt Pharmaceuticals and announced an $11 million Series A financing.

In 2019, Harrow hired founder and former CEO of Doxy.me, Drew Livingston, as its chief innovation officer. Livingston is the senior executive of Harrow's Visionology.com telemedicine subsidiary.

== Administration and drug pricing advocacy ==
The company's founder and chief executive officer is Mark L. Baum, a lawyer by training. Baum has been working in the HIV-related pharmacy field since 1999. Baum has been an advocate for drug pricing and patient advocacy, debating former US congressman James Greenwood on this issue at the Oxford Union debating society. In 2016, Baum authored a monograph on drug pricing and has written about pharmaceutical market monopolies in The Wall Street Journal.

Harrow, through its ImprimisRx subsidiary, has sought to create competition for drugs that companies have monopolies through regulatory or other means by marketing new formulations as a compounding pharmacy. This strategy would allow patient access to certain lower cost medication provided, among other conditions, a patient's physician believed such a formulation was best suited for a patient's needs.

In 2015, the company gained international attention when it compounded a pyrimethamine and leucovorin combination formulation which it argued may offer a low-cost, US$1 per pill, "alternative" to Daraprim, a medication which gained public attention after its price in the United States was increased by over 5,000 percent by Martin Shkreli and Turing Pharmaceuticals. In December 2015, Express Scripts accepted the company's product into its formulary.

In 2016, it introduced a lower cost version of tiopronin, and was said to have been working on a version of Mylan's EpiPen. The EpiPen competitor's price target was US$100 for a pair of injectors.

In October 2015, Anthony Principi, a former United States Secretary of Veterans Affairs, was elected to the company's board of directors.

== ImprimisRx compounding business ==
Through its compounding subsidiary ImprimisRx, the company was the first pharmaceutical compounding company to make cGMP ophthalmic eye drops and other sterile compounded products available at a national scale through its FDA-registered outsourcing facility.

ImprimisRx's primary business is that of compounding drugs; that is, combining or altering the formulation of existing drugs to market them to specific populations. As of 2015, the company's business model was driven by development and sale of inexpensive alternatives to off-patent medicines where there was previously only a single manufacturer who could therefore charge outsize prices.

In August 2020, ImprimisRx announced that it was expanding its business beyond compounded drugs and that through a partnership with EyePoint Pharmaceuticals, it would begin to sell Dexycu, an FDA-approved steroid product.

As of 2020, Imprimis operated two pharmaceutical production and distribution facilities, both of which are located in Ledgewood, New Jersey. The company has licenses to operate federally, through the US DEA, and through state pharmacy boards in all 50 of the United States.

== Litigation ==
In 2017, after launching a $49 per month low-cost compounded cyclosporine-A formulation as a potential competitor to Restasis and a glaucoma eye drop program called Simple Drops, the company, alongside Sinceres, became the target of a suit from Allergan for claims connected to supposed false and misleading marketing statements.

The company responded, calling Allergan a "professional litigant" and stating, "Allergan, one of the most powerful Big Pharma companies in the world, has filed this lawsuit against one of the smallest pharmaceutical companies in the world, to snuff out any competition to its high drug price strategies. Allergan, a true Goliath, is bent on ensuring that Americans continue to pay the highest possible prices for its drugs."

During the lawsuit, it was revealed that Allergan engaged in significant lobbying to FDA, state boards of pharmacy, and other federal and state agencies to complain about ImprimisRx. In December 2017, ImprimisRx received a warning letter from the FDA, relaying the agency's determination that the marketing of some of the company's eye drops contained false or misleading claims about efficacy and risks, allegedly in violation of federal law.

After a jury trial, Harrow (then Imprimis Pharmaceuticals) was ordered to pay $0 for disgorgement of profit and $48,500 for lost profit, despite Allergan having sought $60 million.
