= Martin Shkreli =

American financial investor and businessman (born 1983)

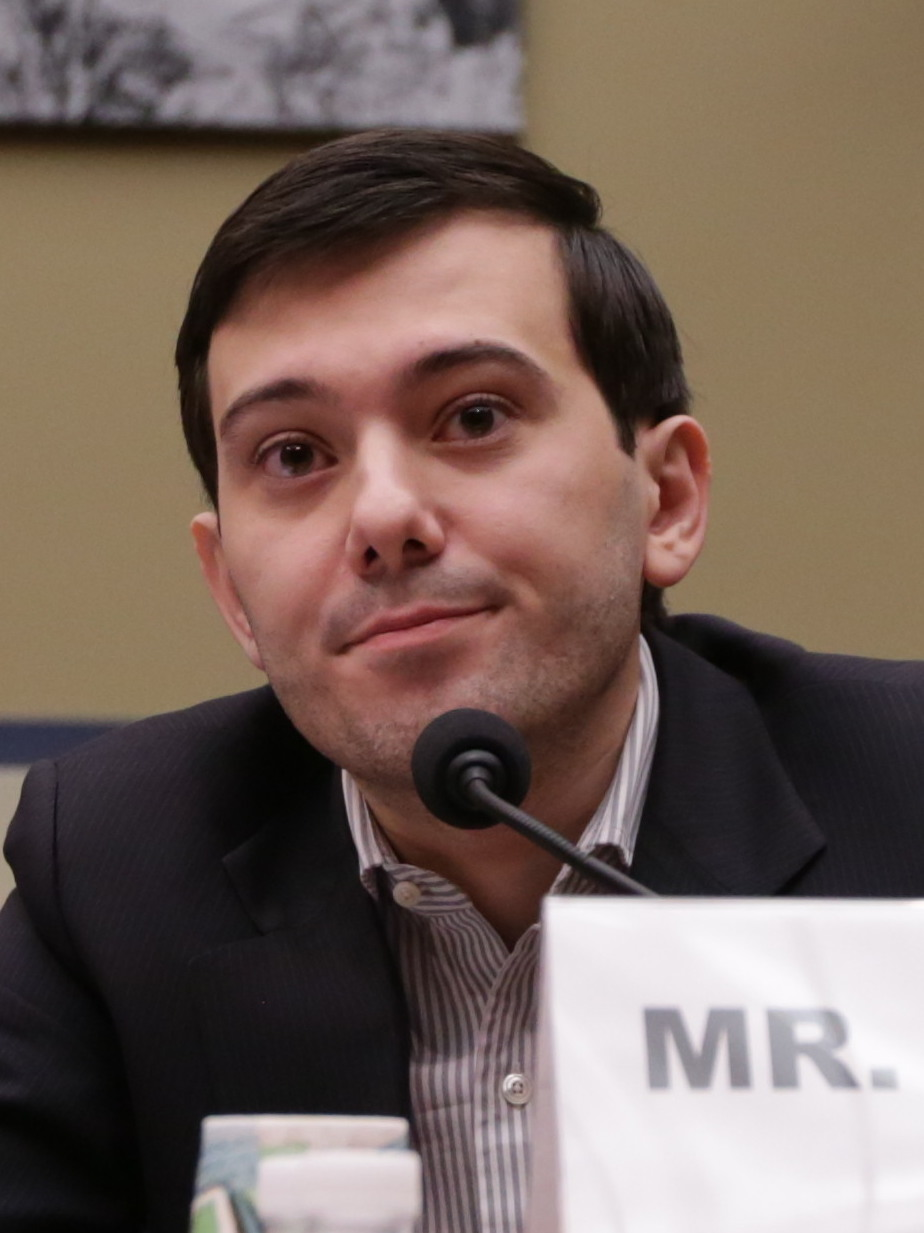
- Shkreli in 2016
- Born: March 17, 1983 (age 43); New York City, U.S.
- Education: Baruch College (BBA)
- Occupations: Investor, Fintech Software developer, YouTuber, former hedge fund manager and biotech founder
- Known for: Turing Pharmaceuticals, Retrophin, Daraprim price hike
- Status: Released
- Convictions: Securities fraud (18 U.S.C. § 1348) (2 counts); Conspiracy to commit securities fraud (18 U.S.C. § 1348)
- Penalty: 7 years in prison (paroled after 6 years and 5 months) $7.4 million in fines

Martin Shkreli (/ˈʃkrɛli/; born March 17, 1983) is an American investor and businessman. Shkreli is the co-founder of the hedge funds Elea Capital, MSMB Capital Management, and MSMB Healthcare, the co-founder and former CEO of pharmaceutical firms Retrophin and Turing Pharmaceuticals, and the former CEO of start-up software company Gödel Systems, which he founded in August 2016.

In September 2015, Shkreli was widely criticized when Turing obtained the manufacturing license for the antiparasitic drug Daraprim and raised its price to insurance companies from $13.50 to $750.00 (USD) per pill, sparking a scandal in the United States and around the world, cementing his reputation as 'the most hated man in America'.

In 2017, Shkreli was convicted in federal court on two counts of securities fraud and one count of conspiracy. He was sentenced to seven years in prison and up to $7.4 million in fines. In the civil antitrust case, Shkreli was fined a further $64.6 million to be repaid to victims. In May 2022, he was released early from the low-security federal prison in Allenwood, Pennsylvania. He is permanently banned from serving as an officer of any publicly traded company.

== Early life ==
Shkreli was born in Coney Island Hospital in the New York City borough of Brooklyn on March 17, 1983. His parents were Roman Catholic, and he said his religion has been "a guiding post" for him, although he does not believe in God. His parents emigrated to the United States from Albania and worked as janitors. His two sisters and his brother grew up in a working-class community in Sheepshead Bay, Brooklyn. Shkreli was raised Catholic and attended Sunday school as a child. Shkreli attended Hunter College High School. Sources differ on whether Shkreli graduated from Hunter or whether he was expelled before his senior year and received the credits necessary for his high school diploma through City-As-School High School. He ended up in a program that placed him in an internship at Wall Street hedge fund Cramer, Berkowitz and Company when he was 17. Shkreli received a bachelor's degree in business administration from Baruch College in 2004.

Shkreli told Vanity Fair that he developed an interest in chemistry when a family member suffered from treatment-resistant depression.

== Career ==
During Shkreli's time at Cramer, Berkowitz and Company, he recommended short-selling the stock of Regeneron Pharmaceuticals, a biotech company testing a weight-loss drug. When its price dropped in accordance with Shkreli's prediction, Cramer's hedge fund profited. Shkreli's prediction drew the attention of the Securities and Exchange Commission, which investigated Shkreli's knowledge about the stock but was unable to prove wrongdoing on his part.

=== MSMB Capital Management ===
After four years as an associate at Cramer Berkowitz, Shkreli worked as a financial analyst for Intrepid Capital Management and UBS Wealth Management. He then started his first hedge fund, Elea Capital Management, in 2006. In 2007, Lehman Brothers sued Elea in New York state court for failing to cover a 'put option transaction' in which Shkreli bet the wrong way on a broad market decline. When stocks rose, Shkreli did not have the money to cover his losses. In October 2007, Lehman Brothers won a $2.3 million default judgment against Shkreli and Elea, but Lehman collapsed before it could collect on the ruling.

In September 2009, Shkreli and a childhood friend Marek Biestek started MSMB Capital Management, which took its name from the initials of the two. Shkreli and Biestek shorted biotech companies, then described flaws in the companies on stock trading chat rooms.

On February 1, 2011, in a naked short sale on an account it held with Merrill Lynch, MSMB Capital sold short 32 million shares of Orexigen Therapeutics stock at about $2.50 per share the day after its price plunged from $9.09, when the Food and Drug Administration (FDA) declined to approve the drug naltrexone/bupropion (Contrave). The stock price rebounded; MSMB could not cover the position, although it had told Merrill Lynch that it could. Merrill Lynch lost $7 million on the trade and MSMB Capital was virtually wiped out. Retrophin's 2015 SEC Complaint contended Shkreli had created MSMB Healthcare and Retrophin "so that he could continue trading after MSMB Capital became insolvent and to create an asset that he might be able to use to placate his MSMB Capital investors."

In 2011, Shkreli filed requests with the FDA to reject a new cancer diagnostic device from Navidea Biopharmaceuticals and an inhalable insulin therapy from MannKind Corporation while publicly short-selling both companies' stocks, the values of which dropped after Shkreli's interventions. The companies had difficulty launching the products as a result, although the FDA ultimately approved both.

In 2011, MSMB made an unsolicited cash bid for AMAG Pharmaceuticals at a price of $378 million. Matthew Herper of Forbes wrote that the attempted hostile takeover was "done for the specific purpose of firing the company's management and stopping a proposed merger with Allos Therapeutics. When the merger plans stopped, so did Shkreli."

=== Retrophin ===
Travere Therapeutics, Inc.
- Formerly: Retrophin, Inc. (2011–2020)
- Traded as: Nasdaq: TVTX; Russell 2000 component; Nasdaq: RTRX (2012–2020)
- Founded: 2011; 15 years ago

Shkreli founded Retrophin (a portmanteau of "Recombinant dystrophin") in 2011 under the MSMB umbrella and ran it as a portfolio company with an emphasis on biotechnology, to create treatments for rare diseases.

In December 2012, Shkreli was chosen for the Forbes 30 Under 30. The publication regretted it eleven years later, placing Shkreli in its "Hall of Shame", a list of ten notably bad picks.

Retrophin's board decided to replace Shkreli in September 2014, and he resigned from the company the following month. He was replaced by Stephen Aselage. During Shkreli's tenure as CEO, the company's employees used alias Twitter accounts to make gangster rap jokes and encourage short selling of other biotech stocks.

After Shkreli's departure, Retrophin filed a US$65 million lawsuit against him in August 2015, claiming that he had breached his duty of loyalty to the biopharmaceutical company in a long-running dispute over his use of company funds and "committed stock-trading irregularities and other violations of securities rules." The lawsuit alleged that Shkreli had threatened and harassed a former MSMB employee and his family.

Shkreli and some of his business associates have been under criminal investigation by the U.S. Attorney for the Eastern District of New York since January 2015. Shkreli invoked his Fifth Amendment right against self-incrimination in order to avoid testifying during civil depositions.

Shkreli's name is on two patents held by Retrophin for drugs to treat PKAN.

In November 2020, Eric Dube, Retrophin's new chief executive, announced the company would be rebranded as Travere Therapeutics Inc. in an effort to further distance the company from Shkreli, and said the company is no longer working on treatments for the disease from which the company takes its name.

==== Views on Shkreli's leadership ====
In July 2017, at Shkreli's criminal trial, Aselage, who was hired by Shkreli in October 2012, and replaced him at Retrophin in 2014, testified "He's a brilliant intellect, visionary" but also someone who was called a "Pied Piper" and whom Aselege "worried about not always getting 'straight answers' from".

==== Thiola price hike ====
In May 2014, Shkreli had difficulty accessing public markets for capital, but received a $4 million series A funding round and a PIPE deal valued at $10 million underwritten by Roth Capital Partners. After obtaining the financing, Shkreli was able to acquire rights to market tiopronin (brand name Thiola), a drug used to treat the rare disease cystinuria, and another drug Chenodal, and subsequently raised the price of each drug substantially, with Thiola being marked up about 20 fold, from $1.50 to $30 per pill (patients must take 10 to 15 pills a day), and Chenodal about fivefold. Retrophin did not lower the price of these drugs after Shkreli's departure.

In 2016, Imprimis Pharmaceuticals introduced a lower cost version of Thiola marketed as a compounded drug.

=== Turing Pharmaceuticals ===
Shkreli founded Turing Pharmaceuticals in February 2015, after his departure from Retrophin. He launched Turing with three drugs in development acquired from Retrophin: An intranasal version of ketamine for depression, an intranasal version of oxytocin, and Vecamyl for hypertension. Shkreli set a business strategy for Turing: To obtain licenses on out-of-patent medicines, and reevaluate the pricing of each in pursuit of windfall profits for the new company, without the need to develop and bring its own drugs to market. As markets for out-of-patent drugs are often small, and obtaining regulatory approval to manufacture a generic version is expensive, Turing calculated that with closed distribution for the product and no competition, it could set high prices.

==== Daraprim price hike ====
On August 10, 2015, in accordance with Shkreli's business plan, Turing acquired Daraprim (pyrimethamine), a medication approved by the FDA in 1953, from Impax Laboratories for US$55 million. The drug's most prominent use as of late 2015 was as an anti-malarial and an antiparasitic, in conjunction with leucovorin and sulfadiazine, to treat patients with both AIDS-related and AIDS-unrelated toxoplasmosis.

The patent for Daraprim had expired, but no generic version was available. The Turing–Impax deal included the condition that Impax remove the drug from regular wholesalers and pharmacies, and so in June 2015, two months before the sale to Turing was announced, Impax switched to tightly controlled distribution. In keeping with its strategy for pricing in the face of limited competition, Turing maintained the closed distribution. The New York Times said that the deal "made sense only if Turing planned to raise the price of the drug substantially."

On September 17, 2015, Dave Muoio of Healio, an in-depth clinical information website for health care specialists, reported on a letter from the Infectious Diseases Society of America and the HIV Medicine Association to executives at Turing, questioning a new pricing for Daraprim. The price of a dose of the drug in the U.S. market increased by a factor of 56 (from US$13.50 to US$750 per pill) overnight.

The price increase was initially criticized, jointly, by the Infectious Diseases Society of America and the HIV Medicine Association, by the Pharmaceutical Research and Manufacturers of America, and soon thereafter by presidential candidates Hillary Clinton, Bernie Sanders, and Donald Trump.

A subsequent organized effort called on Turing to return pricing to pre-September levels and to address several matters relating to the needs of patients, an effort that garnered endorsements from more than 160 medical‑specialty and patient‑related organizations (as of December 2015, 164 organizations from 31 states, the District of Columbia, and Puerto Rico).

In response to the controversy, the record label Collect Records publicly ended its business relationship with Shkreli, who had invested in the company.

In a September 2015 interview with Bloomberg Markets, Shkreli said that despite the price increase, patient co-pays would actually be lower, that many patients would get the drug at no cost, that Turing had expanded its free drug program, and that it sold half of its drugs for one dollar. He defended the price hike by saying, "If there was a company that was selling an Aston Martin at the price of a bicycle, and we buy that company and we ask to charge Toyota prices, I don't think that that should be a crime."

A few days later, Shkreli announced that he planned to lower the price by an unspecified amount, "in response to the anger that was felt by people." But in late November, Turing reversed course and said it would not lower the price after all.

Following a request by Senator Bernie Sanders and Representative Elijah Cummings for details of Turing Pharmaceuticals' finances and price-setting practices in September 2015, the company hired four lobbyists from Buchanan, Ingersoll & Rooney with backgrounds in health care legislation and pharmaceutical pricing. In addition to lobbyists, Shkreli hired a crisis public relations firm to help explain the pricing decision.

On October 22, 2015, Mark L. Baum, CEO of Imprimis Pharmaceuticals, announced that his company would provide a combination product containing pyrimethamine (the active ingredient in Daraprim) and leucovorin at "$1-a-pill" as a cheaper and more efficient alternative to Daraprim. This product was intended to be used alongside sulfadiazine in the standard protocol to treat toxoplasmosis typically seen in AIDS patients.

Baum said, "This is not the first time a sole supply generic drug – especially one that has been approved for use as long as Daraprim – has had its price increased suddenly and to a level that may make it unaffordable." He announced the availability of the compounded replacement for Daraprim as a part of a larger corporate program, "Imprimis Cares." to make "novel and customizable medicines available to physicians and patients at accessible prices." Imprimis began selling its compounded, orally taken formulations of pyrimethamine and leucovorin at US$99 for a 100 count bottle, essentially a dollar a dose.

On November 23, 2015, Turing announced that the company would not reduce the list price of Daraprim, but said it planned instead to negotiate volume discounts of up to 50% for hospitals. Turing issued a statement that it was not as important to cut the list price as to reduce the cost to hospitals, where most patients get their initial treatment. The company pledged that no patient needing Daraprim would ever be denied access.

Infectious disease specialists and patient advocates, including Tim Horn of the Treatment Action Group and Carlos del Rio of the HIV Medicine Association, said Turing's actions were insufficient, given that patients initially treated for days at a hospital typically have to continue the treatment for weeks or months after leaving.

==== Vyera/Phoenixus ====
After Shkreli was imprisoned, Turing changed its name to Vyera in 2017 to avoid negative publicity; in 2019, it was called Phoenixus AG. In March 2019, The Wall Street Journal reported that Shkreli "steers his old company from prison." Using a contraband cellphone from his prison ward in Fort Dix, New Jersey, Shkreli was effectively directing the renamed firm, and was reported to have terminated the employment of executive Kevin P. Mulleady. After this news was reported in various news outlets, Shkreli was moved to the Metropolitan Detention Center in Brooklyn in advance of a subsequent move to a federal prison in Pennsylvania. He was also facing a Bureau of Prisons investigation into his breaking federal prison rules, since federal inmates are prohibited both from running a business from prison and from possessing cell phones.

In May 2023, Vyera Pharmaceuticals declared Chapter 11 bankruptcy in Delaware court, listing between $10 million and $50 million in assets and between $1 million and $10 million in liabilities. The company cited "declining profits, increased competition for generic drugs, and litigation alleging that Vyera suppressed competition for its most valuable drug, Daraprim" per Reuters. Shkreli's shares in Vyera had earlier been ordered seized by federal court related to an FTC judgment against him.

==== FTC v. Vyera Pharmaceuticals ====
In January 2020 the FTC filed a case against Vyera "alleging an elaborate anticompetitive scheme to preserve a monopoly for the life-saving drug, Daraprim". A settlement was reached in December 2021. According to AP News, the settlement "requires Vyera and Phoenixus to provide up to $40 million in relief over 10 years to consumers who allegedly were fleeced by their actions and requires them to make Daraprim available to any potential generic competitor at the cost of producing the drug." Kevin Mulleady "agreed to a seven-year ban on working for or holding more than an 8% share in most pharmaceutical companies."

=== KaloBios Pharmaceuticals ===
In November 2015, an investor group led by Shkreli acquired a majority stake in KaloBios Pharmaceuticals (OTCID Basic Limited: KBIOQ), a biopharmaceutical company based in South San Francisco, California. Shkreli was named CEO of the company and also planned to continue in the role of CEO of Turing Pharmaceuticals. After his December 2015 arrest, KaloBios Pharmaceuticals terminated him as CEO. On December 29, 2015, KaloBios filed for Chapter 11 bankruptcy. This followed NASDAQ delisting its shares, and the resignation of two directors.

=== Gödel Systems, Inc ===
Shkreli founded Gödel Systems in August 2016 as "a professional software company that aims to be the leading information provider of data, workflow, and communications solutions for financial, law, and scientific professionals." By February 2017, Gödel Systems was looking to raise $1 million through a debt offering, and had raised $50,000 out of the $1 million in debt it began issuing in mid-January 2017, according to regulatory filings. Ralph Holzmann, a former senior engineer at Twitter, is the firm's chief technology officer.

=== Druglike and Martin Shkreli Inu coin ===
Following his release from prison, in 2022, a planned software platform named Druglike controlled by Shkreli was announced with a stated aim of supporting the development of new pharmaceutical drugs. A related cryptocurrency project, the Martin Shkreli Inu coin, had been launched but in August lost 90% of its value (recovering shortly afterwards to a 55% loss) after an account believed to belong to Shkreli sold its Inu coin holdings. An account believed to belong to Shkreli claimed, in explanation, to have been hacked.

== Testimony before Congress ==
Shkreli was subpoenaed to appear before the Committee on Oversight and Government Reform of the U.S. House of Representatives to answer questions about the Daraprim price increase. Shkreli's efforts to quash the subpoena were unsuccessful.

On 4 February 2016, Shkreli appeared before the House committee, along with Nancy Retzlaff, the Chief Commercial Officer of Turing, and Howard B. Schiller, the interim CEO of Valeant.

Accompanied by his attorney Benjamin Brafman, Shkreli invoked his Fifth Amendment privilege against self-incrimination in response to every question from committee members except for two: One from Representative Trey Gowdy, to confirm the pronunciation of his last name, and another from Representative Elijah Cummings to affirm he was listening. Shkreli also refused to answer even seemingly trivial questions outside the subject matter of the hearing, including those pertaining to his purchase of a Wu-Tang Clan album. Following Cummings's rebuke of Shkreli, Chairman Jason Chaffetz dismissed Shkreli from the hearing.

== Criminal conviction ==
=== Investigation and charges ===
On December 17, 2015, Shkreli was arrested by the FBI after a federal indictment in the U.S. District Court for the Eastern District of New York was filed, charging him with securities fraud. The charges were filed after an investigation into his tenure at MSMB Capital Management and Retrophin. U.S. Attorney Robert Capers said, "Shkreli essentially ran his company like a Ponzi scheme where he used each subsequent company to pay off defrauded investors from the prior company."

Federal prosecutors said that Shkreli and co-defendant, Evan Greebel, "engaged in multiple schemes to ensnare investors through a web of lies and deceit." In an interview with The Wall Street Journal, Shkreli said that he was targeted by law enforcement for his price hikes of the drug Daraprim and his flamboyant personality.

In early 2016, Shkreli retained criminal defense attorney Benjamin Brafman to defend him. Due to Shkreli's notoriety and overwhelmingly negative public opinion, it was difficult to select an unbiased jury. At his 2017 trial, Shkreli argued that none of his investors actually lost money (some actually turned a profit) and thus his actions did not constitute a crime. Shkreli would frequently criticise the federal prosecutors in New York's Eastern District. Believing them inferior to their counterparts in the Southern District across the East River, he would often refer to them by the epithet "junior varsity", both on his Facebook streaming video feed and in the hallways of the courthouse. This led those prosecutors to request that judge Kiyo A. Matsumoto issue a gag order to prevent what they called a "campaign of disruption". Brafman said in response that his client was responding to baiting from the media and was also suffering from extreme anxiety because of his situation. Matsumoto ordered Shkreli not to speak with reporters, either in the courthouse or its immediate vicinity.

=== Trial, conviction, and sentencing ===
On August 4, 2017, the trial jury found Shkreli guilty on two counts of securities fraud and one count of conspiracy to commit securities fraud, and not guilty on five other counts which included wire fraud. Shkreli said he was delighted with the outcome and described his prosecution as "a witch hunt of epic proportions".

On September 13, 2017, his bail was revoked following a Facebook post offering $5,000 for a strand of Hillary Clinton's hair which the judge perceived as solicitation to assault, which is not protected under the First Amendment. Shkreli's post was preceded by others that suggested he might have plans to clone Hillary Clinton. Shkreli said that his post was satire, and his lawyer described it as tasteless but not a threat. Shkreli edited the post to add a disclaimer that it was satire, and later said he did this minutes after publication. Shkreli apologized for the post. He was sent to the Metropolitan Detention Center, Brooklyn while awaiting sentencing.

On March 9, 2018, Shkreli was sentenced to seven years in federal prison. During his sentencing, Judge Kiyo A. Matsumoto said Shkreli seemed "genuinely remorseful" regarding his "egregious multitude of lies" but faulted him for having "repeatedly minimized" his misconduct. Shkreli, who cried as he gave his statement to the court, stated "I was never motivated by money."

In 2019, Shkreli lost his appeal; the U.S. Court of Appeals for the Second Circuit unanimously affirmed the conviction in a seven-page ruling. The original judgment remained in effect: Shkreli was required to continue to serve his seven-year sentence and forfeit more than $7.3 million in assets.

=== Forfeiture of assets ===
On March 5, 2018, Shkreli was ordered to forfeit nearly $7.4 million in assets. The court ordered that if Shkreli had insufficient cash to fulfill the forfeiture order, his assets, including a piece of art by Pablo Picasso, would be sold to do so. Shkreli purchased the 31-track Wu-Tang Clan album Once Upon a Time in Shaolin (of which a single copy exists) at an auction in 2015 for around $2 million, as well as the then-unreleased Lil Wayne album Tha Carter V. In April 2018, he was ordered to pay $388,000 in restitution.

In July 2021, the United States government auctioned off the Wu-Tang Clan album bought by Shkreli to PleasrDAO for $4 million USD. Jacquelyn M. Kasulis, the acting United States Attorney for the Eastern District of New York, said "Shkreli has been held accountable and paid the price for lying and stealing from investors to enrich himself", and "With today's sale of this one-of-a-kind album, his payment of the forfeiture is now complete."

=== Incarceration ===
Shkreli was federal inmate number 87850-053 and was first held at the Metropolitan Detention Center, Brooklyn, prior to being transferred to federal prison. On March 27, 2018, it was reported that Judge Kiyo Matsumoto agreed to recommend Shkreli serve his prison sentence at the minimum-security federal camp at USP Canaan, which he had previously requested. On April 18, 2018, Shkreli was transferred from Metropolitan Detention Center, Brooklyn, to FCI Fort Dix (a low-security facility) after his request to serve at Canaan was denied. Shkreli was later transferred to FCC Allenwood.

On September 6, 2019, several media outlets reported that Shkreli had leveled a lawsuit in a Brooklyn court claiming he had been fraudulently persuaded by a former investor in his Elea Capital fund to sign a promissory note that "left him owing $420,000 to the man's father." Also in 2019, he was transferred to solitary confinement for a time, after prison authorities discovered he was using a contraband smartphone to conduct business from prison. While incarcerated, he began a relationship with financial reporter Christie Smythe, leading to their engagement during his imprisonment.

Shkreli asked the court for compassionate release in April 2020, saying that he should be allowed to live at the New York City apartment of his then-fiancée (later identified as Smythe) and that his firm needed him to develop a remedy for COVID-19. Judge Matsumoto denied the request and said it was another instance of "delusional self-aggrandizing behavior" by Shkreli.

=== Release ===
On May 18, 2022, Shkreli was released from the Allenwood prison and transferred to a Bureau of Prisons halfway house; according to Shkreli's lawyer Brafman, Shkreli was released after "completing all programs that allowed for his prison sentence to be shortened." He lived in the halfway house until September 2022; after his release, he lived with his sister in Queens and earned $2,500 per month as a consultant for a small law firm. Shkreli wrote that he did the consulting "as a favor, to a friend" and did not "live on $2,500 a month" but rather had an additional salary in a "main day job" for an unlisted position at DL Software, as well as income from other software ventures.

== Civil penalties and industry bans ==
In December 2016, the New York State Department of Taxation and Finance issued a tax warrant against Shkreli for $1.26 million for unpaid taxes. He made partial payments and the State recovered another $134,500 from the auctioning off of various assets seized from Shkreli; these included an Enigma machine for $65,000, a manuscript signed by Isaac Newton, and letters from Charles Darwin and Ada Lovelace.

In April 2018, New York's attorney general asked Judge Matsumoto for priority on more than $480,000 out of the $7.4 million in assets forfeited to the federal government, arguing that the state had priority over the federal government's claims for Shkreli's forfeited assets.

In April 2018, Shkreli agreed to a Securities and Exchange Commission order banning him from the securities industry in exchange for settlement of the SEC administrative action against him; Shkreli is eligible to apply for readmission to the industry.

In 2020, the Federal Trade Commission and seven states—California, Illinois, New York, North Carolina, Ohio, Pennsylvania, and Virginia—filed a civil lawsuit against Shkreli. A seven-day bench trial was held in December 2021. In January 2022, Judge Denise Cote of the U.S. District Court for the Southern District of New York issued a lengthy opinion and order directing Shkreli to return $64.6 million in wrongfully obtained profits (disgorgement); the money is to be distributed to victims nationwide (via the states that were plaintiffs in the case). The court found that Shkreli had violated federal and state law through an anticompetitive scheme to delay "the entry of generic competition for at least eighteen months" and banned Shkreli from the pharmaceutical industry for life. The fine was upheld on appeal by both the Court of Appeals for the Second Circuit and the Supreme Court denied to hear his appeal from that decision.

On February 23, 2022, U.S. District Judge Kiyo Matsumoto of the U.S. District Court for the Eastern District of New York ordered Shkreli to pay a $1.39 million fine for violating securities laws between 2009 and 2014 and banned him from serving as an officer or a director of any publicly traded company for life.

In October 2026, the Federal Trade Commission and the attorneys general of New York, California, Illinois, North Carolina, Ohio, Pennsylvania, and Virgina accused Shkreli of violating his ban on working in the pharmaceutical industry. In a court filing, they say that he streamed stock-trading competitions he participated in and encouraged others to short pharmaceutical stocks.

== Net worth ==
In January 2016, Fortune estimated the then-32-year-old Shkreli's net worth was at least $45 million but later updated its profile to reflect that "[S]ince this article was published the value of Shkreli's E-Trade account had dropped by more than $40 million." Shkreli leveraged a $4 million E-Trade account for his bail.

In June 2017, Reuters reported that Shkreli had reported his net worth at $70 million after being arrested in 2015 and that his attorney Benjamin Brafman, in a hearing before Judge Kiyo Matsumoto, had conceded that his client still owned shares of Turing Pharmaceuticals worth between $30 and $50 million.

== Personal life ==
In December 2020, Shkreli was in a relationship with Christie Smythe, a former reporter for Bloomberg News who broke the news of Shkreli's arrest in 2015. Smythe described their relationship as being "life partners". In October 2021, Smythe said the two had broken up but remained friends.

In October 2023, Vanity Fair published an article on Madison Campbell, the CEO of Leda Health. In the article, it was revealed that Campbell had been involved in a romantic relationship with Shkreli between February and August 2023. Campbell says the two bonded over being "healthcare pariahs" but chose to keep her relationship with him private due to his reputation. Shkreli denied Vanity Fair's request for comment and blocked the author of the article on Twitter.

In August 2025, Martin and his now wife Chelsea S. Voss became parents of Torque "EZMONEY$TAXX" Shkreli.

=== Hobbies and interests ===
Shkreli, an avid League of Legends player, began expressing interest in purchasing an eSports team in May 2014. Enemy eSports rejected a US$1.2 million offer from Shkreli. He later founded his own team, Odyssey eSports, and aimed to qualify for the 2015 North American League of Legends Challenger Series, but the team failed. In August 2015, Odyssey merged with another team to become the organization Team Imagine, with Shkreli becoming chairman of the team. During the merger, the organization signed the Dota 2 team Leviathan.

Shkreli won an auction for the Wu-Tang Clan album Once Upon a Time in Shaolin after the single copy of the album was sold via Paddle8 on November 24, 2015, for US$2 million. In October 2016, Shkreli said on his Twitter account that he would release the album for free download if Donald Trump won the 2016 United States presidential election and would destroy the album if Hillary Clinton won. He shared the intro and one track, the day after Trump was elected.

In September 2017, Shkreli attempted to sell Once Upon a Time in Shaolin on eBay, with the winning bid passing US$1 million. He was incarcerated before the sale could be completed. In March 2018, following Shkreli's conviction for fraud, a federal court seized assets belonging to him worth $7.36 million, including Once Upon a Time in Shaolin. It was sold at an auction in 2021 for an undisclosed amount to raise funds for reimbursing victims. In June 2024, Shkreli was sued by a cryptocurrency collective that bought the album for about $5 million; they claimed Shkreli secretly made digital copies in violation of their deal and distributed them to his friends and followers online. On August 26, 2024, a federal judge ordered Shkreli to turn over all copies, including digital, and report the names of anyone he distributed the music to.
