= Evan Greebel =

American lawyer

- Occupation: Lawyer
- Known for: Conviction for Wire and securities fraud.

Evan Greebel is a convicted felon and the former New York based attorney of Martin Shkreli. Greebel was the outside counsel to Retrophin Inc., which Shkreli co-founded.

In 2017, Greebel was convicted of helping Shkreli defraud investors out of $11 million to repay investors in one of Shkreli's former ventures, and in August 2018, was ordered to serve 18 months in prison.

== Career ==
Greebel is an "ex-partner" at Katten Muchin Rosenman and Kaye Scholer.

== Conviction and sentencing ==
After an 11-week trial, Greebel was found guilty in December 2017 of conspiracy to commit wire fraud and conspiracy to commit securities fraud for helping Shkreli devise fake settlements and consulting contracts with investors in one of Shkreli's former ventures using the assets of Retrophin. Prosecutors had sought no less than 5 years for Greebel, describing him as a "corrupt lawyer," however, in August 2018, Greebel was sentenced to 18 months in prison, ordered to pay $10.5 million in restitution to Retrophin and to forfeit $116,000.

At his sentencing Judge Kiyo Matsumoto said of Greebel:

“He is not feckless. He is not naive. He is not inexperienced, and he was not led astray by a young, brash CEO.”
