= Vyera Pharmaceuticals =

Pharmaceutical company

- Type: Private
- Industry: pharmaceuticals
- Founded: February 2012; 14 years ago
- Founder: Martin Shkreli
- Defunct: 2024
- Headquarters: New York City and Zug, Switzerland
- Key people: Justin Garrett (CEO)
- Products: Vecamyl, Daraprim
- Website: www.vyera.com

Vyera Pharmaceuticals (formerly Turing Pharmaceuticals) was an American pharmaceutical company incorporated in Zug, Switzerland, with offices in New York City. The company started to do business in the US as Vyera Pharmaceuticals in September 2017.

The company has two marketed products: Daraprim (pyrimethamine), for the treatment of toxoplasmosis associated with HIV/AIDS, and Vecamyl (mecamylamine hydrochloride) for the treatment of hypertension. The company was widely criticized for raising the price of daraprim by 5456% following its acquisition of rights to the drug in 2015. The company's stock price dropped around 10% after the price increase of the drug. CEO Martin Shkreli faced immense criticism for his actions. The company was previously named after Alan Turing, the computer scientist.

On May 10, 2023, Vyera filed for Chapter 11 bankruptcy.

== Background ==
Turing Pharmaceuticals was launched in February 2012 by Martin Shkreli with the acquisition of three major assets from an orphan drug developer called Retrophin: an intranasal formulation of ketamine, an oxytocin nasal solution, and Vecamyl. The company acquired the US marketing rights to Daraprim from Impax Laboratories (Now merged into Amneal Pharmaceuticals) in August 2015.

In September 2015, Turing raised the price of Daraprim from $13.50 to $750 a tablet. This increase prompted widespread criticism of the company from many quarters, including the pharmaceutical industry itself.

Shkreli resigned as Turing Pharmaceuticals' CEO on 18 December 2015, following his arrest on charges of defrauding investors in his former hedge fund.

== Daraprim ==
Daraprim is the trade name for the drug pyrimethamine, which is indicated for the treatment of toxoplasmosis in combination with a sulfonamide, and has been available since 1953. At the time of the Daraprim acquisition Turing Pharmaceuticals indicated that it intended to develop new toxoplasmosis drug candidates with better ADME than Daraprim.

In response to criticisms of the September 2015 price increases, Turing Pharmaceuticals announced various patient affordability and access initiatives and in November 2015 the company reduced the cost of Daraprim for hospitals by up to 50% of the increased rate. Despite these partial rollbacks to the initial price increase, according to February 2, 2016, memo from Representative Elijah Cummings to the United States House Committee on Oversight and Government Reform, since Turing's acquisition to the rights in Daraprim, the drug has gone from being affordable and readily available to being prohibitively expensive.

In January 2020 the FTC filed a case against Vyera "alleging an elaborate anticompetitive scheme to preserve a monopoly for the life-saving drug, Daraprim". A settlement was reached in December 2021. According to AP News, the settlement "requires Vyera and Phoenixus to provide up to $40 million in relief over 10 years to consumers who allegedly were fleeced by their actions and requires them to make Daraprim available to any potential generic competitor at the cost of producing the drug." According to Law360, Kevin Mulleady "agreed to a seven-year ban on working for or holding more than an 8% share in most pharmaceutical companies."

== Vecamyl ==
Vecamyl is currently indicated for the treatment of hypertension.

== Pipeline ==
=== Syntocinon ===
This product, also called TUR-001, is Turing Pharmaceuticals' oxytocin nasal solution. Syntocinon, short for 'synthetic oxytocin', was first introduced by the Swiss pharmaceutical company Sandoz in 1956. The product had gained FDA approval in 1960 to assist in initial postpartum milk ejection, but was discontinued by Sandoz's successor company, Novartis, in 1997 because of poor sales. Retrophin had licensed the product from Novartis in December 2013 in order to bring it back to the market for postpartum milk ejection as well as look into its use in the treatment of schizophrenia and autism. Turing Pharmaceuticals is preparing for a Phase III in lactation and other indications are planned.

=== TUR-002 ===
This product is Turing Pharmaceuticals' intranasal formulation of racemic ketamine. The company is working on the product for the treatment of suicidality.

=== TUR-004 ===
This product is under development for the treatment of seizures associated with severe epilepsy disorders. Turing Pharmaceuticals made an IND filing for TUR-004 in October 2015, and the product was granted Fast Track designation by the FDA. A Phase I Clinical Trial of TUR 004 for epileptic encephalopathies commenced in November 2015.

=== Other products in development ===
Turing Pharmaceuticals is also working on TRP-001 for glycogen storage disorders, TRP-002 for developmental disorder, TRP-003 for leukodystrophy, TRP-004 for toxoplasmosis, TRP-005 for epileptic encephalopathy, and TRP-011 for congenital metabolic disorder.
