= Acetylglycinamide chloral hydrate =

Chemical compound

Combination of
- N-Acetylglycinamide: glycine derivative
- Chloral hydrate: sedative/hypnotic

Clinical data
- ATC code: N05CC03 (WHO)

Identifiers
- CAS Number: 17427-14-4
- PubChem CID: 71587019
- UNII: 6WZ3595RLZ
- CompTox Dashboard (EPA): DTXSID00169803

Acetylglycinamide chloral hydrate is a hypnotic/sedative. It is a combination of acetylglycinamide and chloral hydrate.
