= Biliary dyskinesia =

Inability of bile to move through the biliary tract

- Specialty: General surgery

Biliary dyskinesia is a disorder of some component of the biliary part of the digestive system in which bile cannot physically move in the proper direction through the tubular biliary tract. It most commonly involves abnormal biliary tract peristalsis muscular coordination within the gallbladder in response to dietary stimulation of that organ to squirt the liquid bile through the common bile duct into the duodenum. Ineffective peristaltic contraction of that structure produces postprandial (after meals) right upper abdominal pain (cholecystodynia) and almost no other problem. When the dyskinesia is localized at the biliary outlet into the duodenum just as increased tonus of that outlet sphincter of Oddi, the backed-up bile can cause pancreatic injury with abdominal pain more toward the upper left side. In general, biliary dyskinesia is the disturbance in the coordination of peristaltic contraction of the biliary ducts, and/or reduction in the speed of emptying of the biliary tree into the duodenum.

== Mechanism ==
Normally, the downstream gallbladder stores and concentrates the bile which originates in liver hepatocyte cells and is released into the microscopic component of the biliary system by the liver. Through aggregating tubules of increasing diameter, the bile leaves the liver and reaches the upstream (proximal) component of the common bile duct. Apparently, the common bile duct beyond (distal to) the gallbladder tends to normally have a greater tone so that the bile backs up into the gallbladder. When bile enters the duodenum (the first part of the small intestine), it aids in digesting the fat within food leaving the stomach. When the bile can not be properly propelled from the not-mechanically obstructed gallbladder or can not flow out of the end of the common bile duct properly, there is a state of biliary dyskinesia.

So, biliary dyskinesia is a dynamically (functional...not fixed mechanical) obstructive, pain-producing disorder. Obstruction by a stone or tumor is a static, mechanical obstruction and tends to produce a more intense pain known as biliary colic.

Failure of the biliary sphincter of Oddi can be distinguished from failure of the pancreatic sphincter.

== Diagnosis ==
Diagnosis may or may not be determined by an ultrasound, but most likely the disease and other biliary diseases of the liver, gallbladder, and bile duct are found by what is most commonly referred to as a hepatobiliary or HIDA scan. This type of imaging is known as cholescintigraphy.

=== Cholescintigraphy ===
Cholescintigraphy or hepatobiliary scintigraphy is scintigraphy of the hepatobiliary tract, including the gallbladder and bile ducts. The image produced by this type of medical imaging, called a cholescintigram, is also known by other names depending on which radiotracer is used, such as HIDA scan, PIPIDA scan, DISIDA scan, or BrIDA scan. Cholescintigraphic scanning is a nuclear medicine procedure to evaluate the health and function of the gallbladder and biliary system. A radioactive tracer is injected through any accessible vein and then allowed to circulate to the liver and starts accumulating in the gall bladder which can take up to an hour. A standard fatty meal (usually a high fat milk shake) is then given and more imaging is performed for another hour so that the response to the fatty meal by the gall bladder can be shown. The gall bladder should respond and begin emptying into the duodenum, the amount of bile ejected can then be calculated as an ejection fraction (EF). An EF < 35% is considered to be diagnostic of biliary dyskinesia and suitable for cholecystectomy to be considered.

== Treatment ==
Laparoscopic cholecystectomy has been used to treat the condition when due to dyskinesia of the gallbladder.

=== Prognosis ===
Symptoms may persist after cholecystectomy, and have been linked to the use of proton pump inhibitors.

== See also ==
- Bile acid malabsorption, an entry of the bile acid into a large intestine due to malabsorption the bile in the ileum, which may cause chronic diarrhea.
