= 2,5-dioxopiperazine hydrolase =

Class of enzymes

Identifiers
- EC no.: 3.5.2.13
- CAS no.: 97599-45-6

Databases
- BRENDA: enzyme data
- ExPASy: NiceZyme view
- KEGG: enzyme entry
- MetaCyc: metabolic pathway
- Rhea: reactions
- PDB structures: RCSB PDB PDBe PDBsum
- Gene Ontology: AmiGO / QuickGO
Search
- PMC: articles
- PubMed: articles
- NCBI: proteins

2,5-dioxopiperazine hydrolase (EC 3.5.2.13) is an enzyme characterised from pig duodenum that catalyzes the hydrolysis of 2,5-diketopiperazine to glycylglycine:

2,5-diketopiperazine
H_{2}O
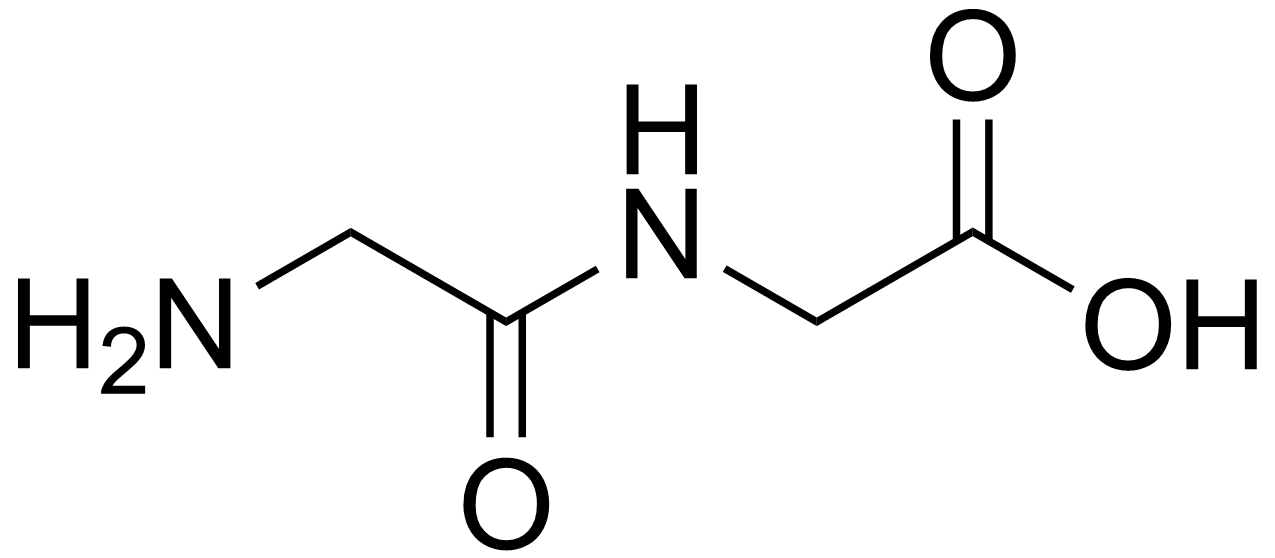
glycylglycine

This enzyme is a hydrolase, one acting on carbon-nitrogen bonds other than peptide bonds, specifically in cyclic amides. The systematic name of this enzyme class is 2,5-dioxopiperazine amidohydrolase. Other names in common use include cyclo(Gly-Gly) hydrolase, and cyclo(glycylglycine) hydrolase.
