= Hida (surname) =

Hida (written: 飛田, 飛弾 or 肥田) is a Japanese surname. Notable people with the surname include:

- Haruzo Hida (肥田 晴三, born 1952), Japanese mathematician
- Kimiko Hida (飛田 季実子, born 1977), Japanese handball player
- Satoshi Hida (飛弾 暁, born 1984), Japanese footballer
- Shuntaro Hida (肥田 舜太郎, born 1917), Japanese physician
- Takayuki Hida (肥田 隆行, born 1944), Japanese speed skater
- Takeyuki Hida (飛田武幸, born 1927, died 2017), Japanese mathematician
