= DT-109 =

Clinical data
- Other names: DT109; Diapin; Glycylglycyl-L-leucine; Glycyl-glycyl-L-leucine; Gly-Gly-Leu
- ATC code: None

Identifiers
- IUPAC name: (2S)-2-[[2-[(2-aminoacetyl)amino]acetyl]amino]-4-methylpentanoic acid
- CAS Number: 14857-82-0
- PubChem CID: 6992871
- ChemSpider: 5360989
- ChEBI: CHEBI:73904
- ChEMBL: ChEMBL52895

Chemical and physical data
- Formula: C_{10}H_{19}N_{3}O_{4}
- Molar mass: 245.279 g·mol^{−1}
- 3D model (JSmol): Interactive image
- SMILES: CC(C)C[C@@H](C(=O)O)NC(=O)CNC(=O)CN
- InChI: InChI=1S/C10H19N3O4/c1-6(2)3-7(10(16)17)13-9(15)5-12-8(14)4-11/h6-7H,3-5,11H2,1-2H3,(H,12,14)(H,13,15)(H,16,17)/t7-/m0/s1; Key:XPJBQTCXPJNIFE-ZETCQYMHSA-N

DT-109, also known as Diapin or as glycyl-glycyl-L-leucine (Gly-Gly-L-Leu), is a glycine-based tripeptide with various biological activities.

It has been found to lower blood glucose levels, increase insulin and glucagon-like peptide 1 (GLP-1) levels, and lower unfavorable lipid levels without causing hypoglycemia in rodents. The drug has been found to reduce atherosclerosis and calcification in rodents and monkeys via stimulation of glutathione production and antioxidant effects. It has been found to lower abundance of Clostridium species such as Clostridium perfringens in the gut and to attenuate Clostridium perfringens-mediated intestinal ammonia and endotoxin production, gut barrier disruption, and associated sequelae such as hepatotoxicity and metabolic dysfunction-associated steatohepatitis (MASH) in rodents and non-human primates. Additional mechanisms of its beneficial effects on MASH include stimulation of fatty acid degradation and glutathione formation and modulation of microbial bile acid metabolism. Glycine also shares some of the beneficial effects of DT-109, but DT-109 is more potent in comparison.

DT-109 was first described in the scientific literature by 2013. It is under development for various potential medical uses by Diapin Therapeutics and has reached phase 1 clinical trials.
