= Law360 =

Legal news service

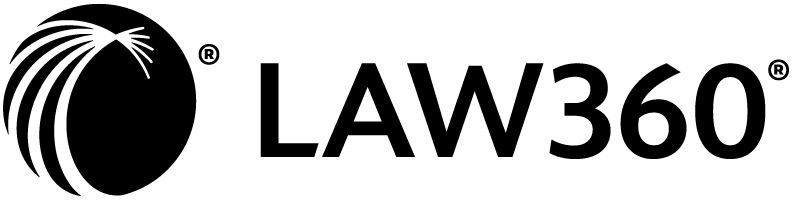
- Available in: English
- Headquarters: 230 Park Avenue, New York City, U.S.
- Owner: LexisNexis
- Creators: Magnus Hoglund, Marius Meland
- Website: www.law360.com
- Commercial: Yes
- Launched: October 2003; 22 years ago (as Portfolio Media)

Law360 is a subscription-based, legal news service based in New York City. It is operated by Portfolio Media, Inc., a subsidiary of LexisNexis and delivers breaking news and analysis to more than 2 million U.S. legal professionals across 60 practice areas, industries and topics, including a free section dedicated to Access to Justice, which reports on "access of individuals and disadvantaged populations to adequate, equitable, and essential criminal and civil justice systems as well as the noteworthy initiatives and individuals who promote such a cause."

Since 2003, Law360 has expanded its layout and organization, adding special sections on various topics supplementing the daily news, editorial analysis, business of law, and features. Since 2022, Law360 has been organized into the following sections: Law360 U.S., Law360 U.K., Law360 Pulse, Law360 Tax Authority, Law360 Employment Authority, Law360 Insurance Authority, Law360 Real Estate Authority, and other features.

== History ==
=== Origins ===
In 2003, Marius Meland, founder of Portfolio Media, began publishing a daily online newsletter on intellectual property law. In 2004, Meland partnered with Magnus Hoglund, expanding their coverage into other legal practice areas and launching Law360 in 2006.

=== Acquisitions ===
In 2012, the company was acquired by RELX to be part of the LexisNexis offering.

== Products ==
=== Law360 Pulse ===
Law360 Pulse, launched in January 2021, covers the legal industry from breaking news and industry trends to data-driven surveys and rankings. Law360 Pulse sections include Modern Lawyer, Daily Litigation, Mid-Law and Courts, as well as regional-specific coverage. Pulse also conducts several surveys such as its Diversity Snapshot, Glass Ceiling Report, Lawyer Satisfaction Survey, Partner Compensation Survey and Summer Associates Survey.

=== Law360 Tax Authority ===
Launched in June 2018, Law360 Tax Authority focuses on federal, state and local and international tax, with coverage including legislation, regulation and enforcement, executive actions, and litigation.

=== Law360 Employment Authority ===
In December 2020, Law360 added Employment Authority to its news service, covering labor, discrimination, and wage and hour.

=== Law360 Insurance Authority ===
Law360 introduced Insurance Authority in September 2021, providing news coverage and analysis in property, general liability, and specialty line insurance.

=== Law360 Real Estate Authority ===
Law360 introduced Real Estate Authority in June 2022. Law360 Real Estate Authority reports on trends, deals, litigation and policies in commercial and residential real estate.

=== Law360 U.K. ===
In 2016, Law360 expanded its newsroom to the U.K., offering daily news coverage for legal professionals in Commercial Litigation, Corporate Crime & Compliance, Financial Services, Insurance, Transactions, Employment and legal industry under the Pulse name

=== Law360 Canada ===
In February 2023, The Lawyer's Daily was rebranded as Law360 Canada. The publication was originally launched in 1983 as the Ontario Lawyers Weekly by managing editor Michael Fitz-James, and rebranded to The Lawyers Weekly. In 2017, the publication went from a weekly print newspaper to an online publication and renamed itself The Lawyer's Daily.

== Podcasts ==
Law360 offers a number of podcasts relating to the law and legal system. The flagship podcast, Pro Say, is a weekly podcast that recaps the biggest legal stories of the week and features guests from both inside the Law360 newsroom and from the legal community. The show also typically includes a segment called "offbeat" about oddities and humorous legal stories. The podcast was launched in June 2017 and is hosted by Amber McKinney and Alex Lawson.

Law360's second podcast was launched in September 2019 and is called The Term. The show provides an overview of the action in the U.S. Supreme Court each week that the court is in session. Each episode is approximately 20 minutes, and are hosted by Law360's Supreme Court Reporter, Jimmy Hoover and Assistant Managing Editor, Natalie Rodriguez.

The company also launched a narrative podcast series, under the umbrella of Law360 Explores. The first season was Law360 Explores: Legalization, a five-part series that focused on the tension for marijuana businesses that have to navigate how the drug is legal in many states but remains illegal at the federal level. Season one was hosted by senior cannabis reporter Diana Novak Jones. The second season, The Fall of Tom Girardi hosted by investigative reporter Brandon Lowrey, investigates how one of the U.S.'s most successful plaintiff's attorney went from a legal star to being accused of exploiting survivors of an explosion as well as widows and orphans of plane crash victims.
