= N-(2-Carboxyethyl)iminodiacetic acid =

Names
- IUPAC name N,N-Bis(carboxymethyl)-β-alanine
- Systematic IUPAC name 3-[Bis(carboxymethyl)amino]propanoic acid

Identifiers
CAS Number	6245-75-6
3D model (JSmol)	Interactive image
ChemSpider	466712
ECHA InfoCard	100.025.782
EC Number	228-360-6
PubChem CID	535795
UNII	KOU355F9Z2
CompTox Dashboard (EPA)	DTXSID8074607
- InChI: InChI=1S/C7H11NO6/c9-5(10)1-2-8(3-6(11)12)4-7(13)14/h1-4H2,(H,9,10)(H,11,12)(H,13,14) Key: UWRBFYBQPCJRRL-UHFFFAOYSA-N
- SMILES: C(CN(CC(=O)O)CC(=O)O)C(=O)O

Properties
Chemical formula	C_{7}H_{11}NO_{6}
Molar mass	205.166 g·mol^{−1}
Appearance	White solid
Melting point	190–200 °C (374–392 °F; 463–473 K) (decomposition)
Solubility in water	Soluble
- Except where otherwise noted, data are given for materials in their standard state (at 25 °C [77 °F], 100 kPa). Infobox references

N-(2-Carboxyethyl)iminodiacetic acid or β-ADA (β-alanine diacetate) is an organic compound with the formula HO_{2}CCH_{2}CH_{2}N(CH_{2}CO_{2}H)_{2}. It is a white solid. The compound is classified as an aminocarboxylic acid, formally a derivative of glycine.

== Ligand properties ==
The conjugate base is tetradentate complexing agent that forms 1:1 complexes with cations having a charge number of at least +2, e.g. the "hard water forming" cations Ca^{2+} or Mg^{2+}. N-(2-Carboxyethyl)iminodiacetic acid should not be confused with α-alaninediacetic acid, also known as methylglycinediacetic acid (MGDA) or α-ADA. Alkaline earth and heavy metal complexes of both, α-ADA and β-ADA are biodegradable (in contrast to chelate complexes with conventional complexing agents such as EDTA).

== Production ==
N-(2-carboxyethyl)iminodiacetic acid was first prepared from β-alanine and monochloroacetic acid as reported by Gerold Schwarzenbach in 1949.

HO_{2}CCH_{2}CH_{2}N(CH_{2}CO_{2}H)_{2} + 2 ClCH_{2}CO_{2}H → HO_{2}CCH_{2}CH_{2}N(CH_{2}CO_{2}H)_{2} + 2 HCl

The double cyanomethylation of β-alanine as starting material provides with methanal and alkali cyanides and subsequent hydrolysis of the intermediately formed bis-methyl cyanides followed by acidification with mineral acids β-ADA (N-(2-carboxyethyl)iminodiacetic acid) in yields of only 80%, but very high purity of 99.8%.

The cyanoethylation of iminodiacetic acid with 2-propenenitrile by a Michael addition provides the ethyl cyano compound, which produces after alkaline hydrolysis and acidification β-ADA with a total yield of 93.6% and purity of 99.9% .

In the analogue reaction with acrylic acid esters, 99.9% β-ADA are obtained after acidification in a total yield of 97.6%.

A more direct route is via the Michael addition of acrylic acid to iminodiacetic acid, which produces the trisodium salt of β-ADA in 97% yield and 99.2% purity. The conversion to β-ADA itself is not described in this patent specification.

The most economical synthesis route is based on iminodiacetic acid, which is easily accessible by oxidizing diethanolamine and serves as a key raw material for the herbicide glyphosate.

== Properties ==
N-(2-Carboxyethyl)iminodiacetic acid is very well degradable in sewage plant simulations (98% after eight weeks). It is low in toxicity. Elsewhere, the poor microbial degradability and adsorbability of β-ADA is pointed out. The contradictory assessment of the degradability of β-ADA, the weaker complex formation compared to the (rapidly biodegradable) methylglycine diacetic acid (MGDA, Trilon M) and the lower stability in wide temperature and pH ranges have substantially contributed to the breakthrough of MGDA as the most suitable substitute for EDTA.

== Use ==
Like other complexing agents from the class of aminopolycarboxylic acids, N-(2-carboxyethyl)iminodiacetic acid is used in water softening, in detergents and cleaning agents, in electroplating, cosmetics, paper and textile production. This is based on its ability to form stable chelate complexes with polyvalent ions, in particular the water hardness formers Ca^{2+} and Mg^{2+}, as well as transition and heavy metal ions, such as Fe^{3+}, Mn^{2+}, and Cu^{2+}, etc.
