= Iminodiacetic acid =

- Skeletal formula of iminodiacetic acid

Names
- Preferred IUPAC name 2,2′-Azanediyldiacetic acid
- Other names 2-(Carboxymethylamino)acetic acid Diglycolamidic acid

Identifiers
CAS Number	142-73-4
3D model (JSmol)	Interactive image
Beilstein Reference	878499
ChEBI	CHEBI:24786
ChEMBL	ChEMBL461164
ChemSpider	8557
ECHA InfoCard	100.005.051
EC Number	205-555-4
KEGG	C19911
MeSH	imnodiacetic+acid
PubChem CID	8897
RTECS number	AI2975000
UNII	XQM2L81M8Z
CompTox Dashboard (EPA)	DTXSID2027098
- InChI: InChI=1S/C4H7NO4/c6-3(7)1-5-2-4(8)9/h5H,1-2H2,(H,6,7)(H,8,9) Key: NBZBKCUXIYYUSX-UHFFFAOYSA-N
- SMILES: OC(=O)CNCC(O)=O

Properties
Chemical formula	C_{4}H_{7}NO_{4}
Molar mass	133.103 g·mol^{−1}
Appearance	Colourless crystals
Density	1.436 g mL^{−1}
log P	1.84
Acidity (pK_{a})	1.873
Basicity (pK_{b})	12.124

Thermochemistry
Std enthalpy of formation (Δ_{f}H^{⦵}_{298})	−933.9–−931.3 kJ mol^{−1}
Std enthalpy of combustion (Δ_{c}H^{⦵}_{298})	−1.6430–−1.6406 MJ mol^{−1}

Hazards
- GHS labelling
Pictograms	(GHS07: Exclamation mark)
Signal word	Warning
Hazard statements	H315, H319, H335
Precautionary statements	P261, P305+P351+P338
Flash point	178 °C (352 °F; 451 K)

Related compounds
Related alkanoic acids	Acetylcysteine; Glycylglycine; Nitrilotriacetic acid; N-Oxalylglycine; Tiopronin; Bucillamine; Oxalyldiaminopropionic acid
Related compounds	N-Acetylglycinamide
- Except where otherwise noted, data are given for materials in their standard state (at 25 °C [77 °F], 100 kPa). verify (what is ?) Infobox references

Iminodiacetic acid is the organic compound with the formula HN(CH_{2}CO_{2}H)_{2}, often abbreviated to IDA. A white solid, the compound is a dicarboxylic acid amine (the nitrogen atom forms a secondary amino group, not an imino group as the name suggests). IDA is a popular chelating ligand, first introduced in the early 1950s by Schwarzenbach.

== Ligand ==
The iminodiacetate dianion is typically a tridentate ligand, forming metal complexes by forming two, fused, five membered chelate rings. IDA thus forms stronger complexes than the bidentate ligand glycine and weaker complexes than the tetradentate ligand nitrilotriacetic acid.

Structure of an iron(III) bis ida complex.

IDA can also act as a bidentate ligand through its two carboxylate groups. Several technetium-99m complexes with bidentate IDA derivatives are used in cholescintigraphy scans (the so-called "hepatobiliary iminodiacetic acid scans") to evaluate the health and function of the gallbladder. Common IDA derivatives include lidofenin, mebrofenin, and disofenin that replace the secondary amine proton with an amide and aromatic substituent.

The proton on the nitrogen atom can be replaced by a carbon atom of a polymer to create an ion-exchange resin, such as chelex 100.

== Other applications ==
Iminodiacetic acid is an important intermediate in one of the two main industrial processes used to manufacture the herbicide glyphosate. It is used in capillary electrophoresis for modulating peptide mobility. It is also used as a precursor for the manufacture of the indicator xylenol orange.

== Synthesis ==
A most efficient iminodiacetic synthesis dehydrogenates diethanolamine over a catalyst.

== Related compounds ==
- N-Methylimidodiacetic acid (MIDA)
- N-(2-Carboxyethyl)iminodiacetic acid
- Nitrilotriacetic acid (NTA)
- N-hydroxyiminodiacetic acid (HIDA), HON(CH_{2}CO_{2}H)_{2} (registry number = 87339-38-6) See HIDA scan.
- Thymolphthalexone
