= N-Oxalylglycine =

- Partially condensed, skeletal formula of N-oxalylglycine

Names
- IUPAC name N-Oxaloglycine
- Systematic IUPAC name [(Carboxymethyl)amino](oxo)acetic acid

Identifiers
CAS Number	5262-39-5
3D model (JSmol)	Interactive image
Abbreviations	NOG
ChEBI	CHEBI:44482
ChEMBL	ChEMBL90852
ChemSpider	2338366
ECHA InfoCard	100.213.188
MeSH	oxalylglycine
PubChem CID	3080614
UNII	VVW38EB8YS
CompTox Dashboard (EPA)	DTXSID20200601
- InChI: InChI=1S/C4H5NO5/c6-2(7)1-5-3(8)4(9)10/h1H2,(H,5,8)(H,6,7)(H,9,10) Key: BIMZLRFONYSTPT-UHFFFAOYSA-N
- SMILES: OC(=O)CNC(=O)C(O)=O

Properties
Chemical formula	C_{4}H_{5}NO_{5}
Molar mass	147.086 g·mol^{−1}
Appearance	Colorless solid
log P	1.232
Acidity (pK_{a})	2.827
Basicity (pK_{b})	11.170

Related compounds
Related compounds	N-Acetylglycinamide; Glycylglycine; Oxalyldiaminopropionic acid
- Except where otherwise noted, data are given for materials in their standard state (at 25 °C [77 °F], 100 kPa). verify (what is ?) Infobox references

N-Oxalylglycine is the organic compound with the formula HO_{2}CC(O)NHCH_{2}CO_{2}H. This colourless solid is used as an inhibitor of α-ketoglutarate-dependent enzymes. It is isosteric with α-Ketoglutaric acid. Such enzymes are pervasive and, for example, are required for the synthesis of 4-hydroxyproline.
