= Cholescintigraphy =

Medical imaging of hepatobiliary tract using radiotracers

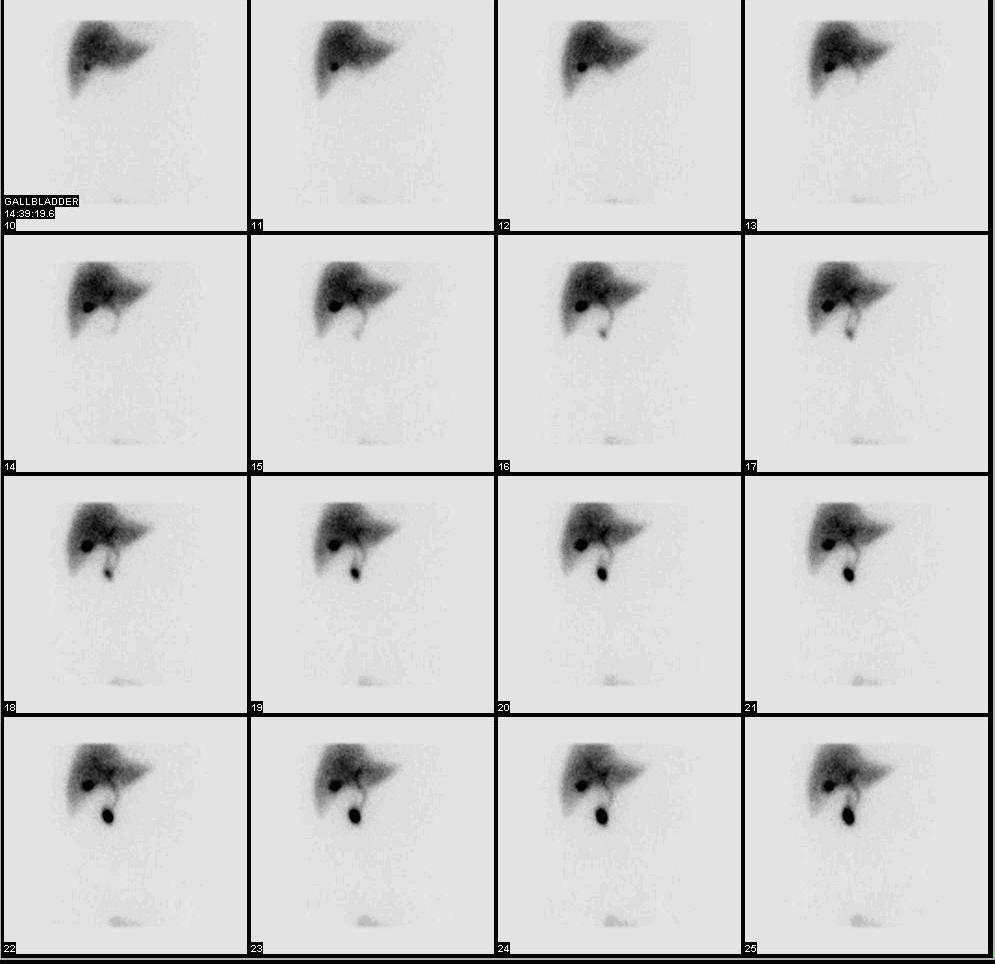
- Normal hepatobiliary scan (HIDA scan). The nuclear medicine hepatobiliary scan is clinically useful in the detection of the gallbladder disease.
- ICD-9-CM: 92.02
- OPS-301 code: 3-707.6

Cholescintigraphy or hepatobiliary scintigraphy is scintigraphy of the hepatobiliary tract, including the gallbladder and bile ducts. The image produced by this type of medical imaging, called a cholescintigram, is also known by other names depending on which radiotracer is used, such as HIDA scan, PIPIDA scan, DISIDA scan, or BrIDA scan. Cholescintigraphic scanning is a nuclear medicine procedure to evaluate the health and function of the gallbladder and biliary system. A radioactive tracer is injected through any accessible vein and then allowed to circulate to the liver, where it is excreted into the bile ducts and stored by the gallbladder until released into the duodenum.

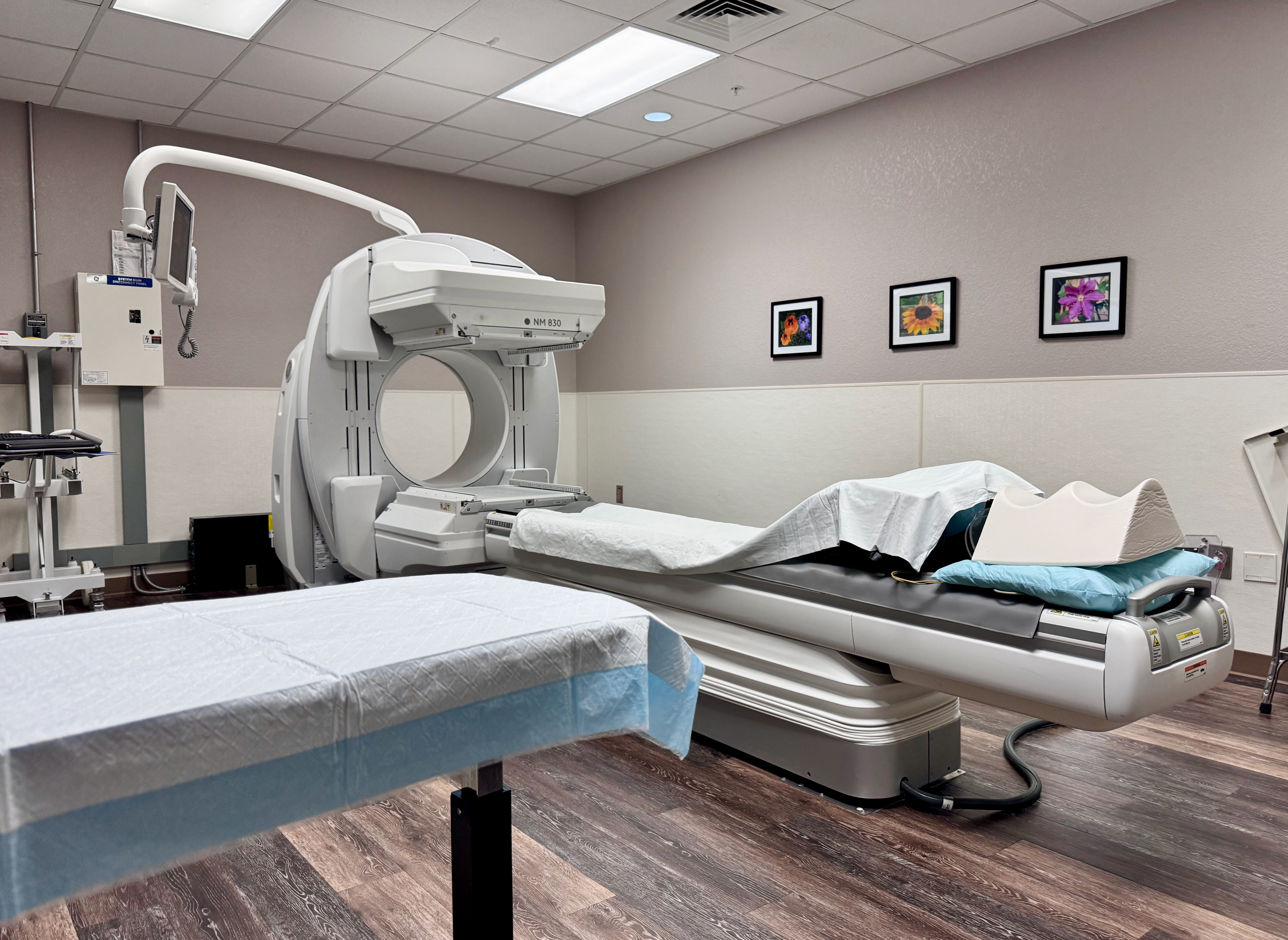
A nuclear medicine machine used for hepatobiliary scintigraphy in a hospital in North Carolina

Use of cholescintigraphic scans as a first-line form of imaging varies depending on indication. For example for cholecystitis, cheaper and less invasive ultrasound imaging may be preferred, while for bile reflux cholescintigraphy may be the first choice.

== Etymology and pronunciation ==
The word cholescintigraphy (/ˌkoʊliˌsɪnˈtɪɡrəfi/) uses combining forms of chole- + scinti(llation) + -graphy, most literally "bile + flash + recording".

== Medical use ==
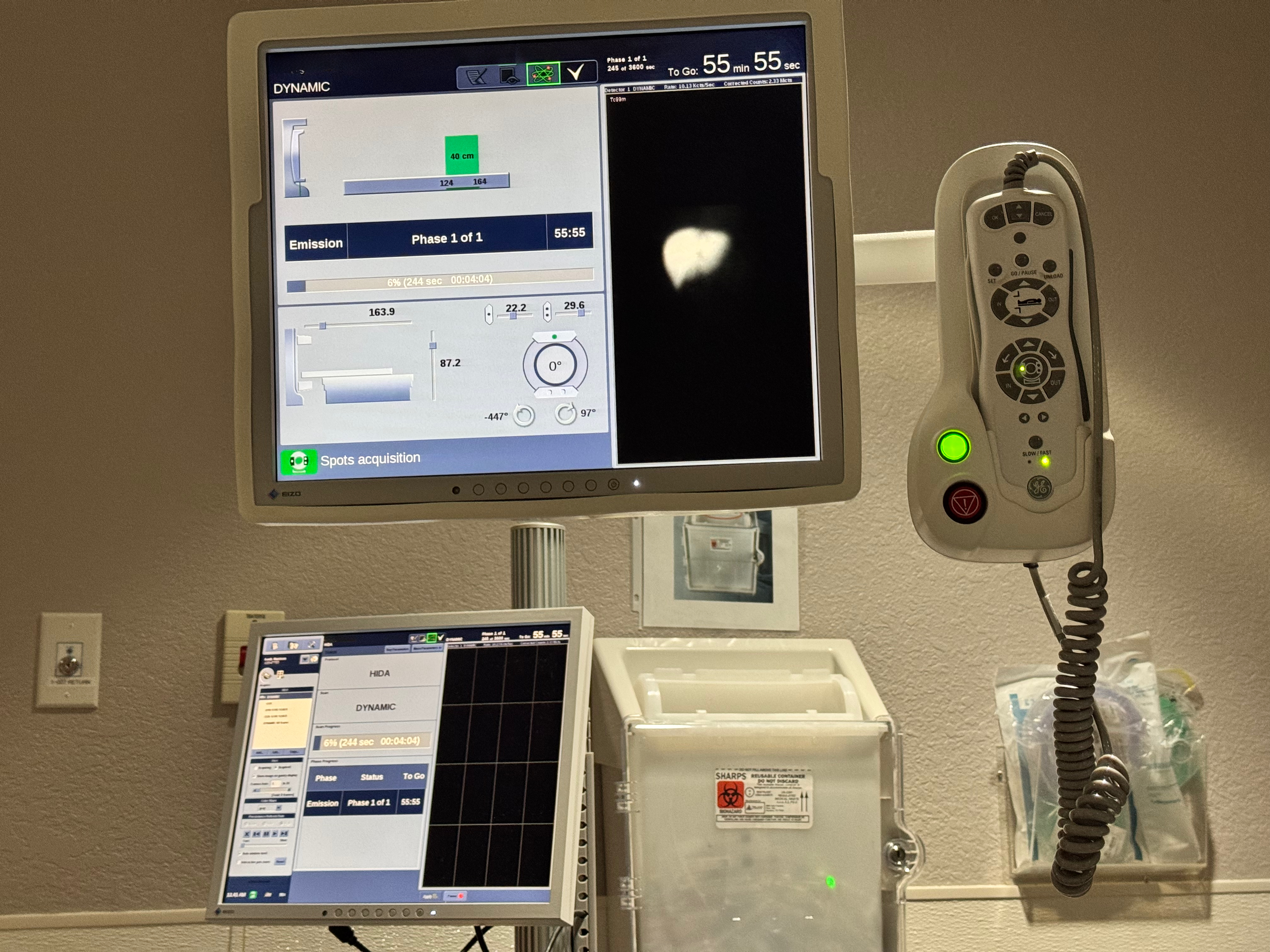
A screen displays the results of a HIDA scan in realtime while a patient undergoes medical imaging.

In the absence of gallbladder disease, the gallbladder is visualized within 1 hour of the injection of the radioactive tracer.

If the gallbladder is not visualized within 4 hours after the injection, this indicates either cholecystitis or cystic duct obstruction, such as by cholelithiasis (gallstone formation).

=== Cholecystitis ===
The investigation is usually conducted after an ultrasonographic examination of the abdominal right upper quadrant for a patient presenting with abdominal pain. If the noninvasive ultrasound examination fails to demonstrate gallstones, or other obstruction to the gallbladder or biliary tree, in an attempt to establish a cause of right upper quadrant pain, a cholescintigraphic scan can be performed as a more sensitive and specific test.

Cholescintigraphy for acute cholecystitis has sensitivity of 97%, specificity of 94%. Several investigators have found the sensitivity being consistently higher than 90% though specificity has varied from 73–99%, yet compared to ultrasonography, cholescintigraphy has proven to be superior. The scan is also important to differentiate between neonatal hepatitis and biliary atresia, because an early surgical intervention in form of Kasai portoenterostomy or hepatoportoenterostomy can save the life of the baby as the chance of a successful operation after 3 months seriously decreases.

=== Biliary dyskinesia ===
Cholescintigraphy is also used in diagnosis of the biliary dyskinesia.

== Radiotracers ==
Most radiotracers for cholescintigraphy are metal complexes of iminodiacetic acid (IDA) with a radionuclide, usually technetium-99m. This metastable isotope has a half-life of 6 hours, so batches of radiotracer must be prepared as needed using a moly cow. A widely recognized trade name for the preparation kits is TechneScan. These radiopharmaceuticals include the following:

Nonproprietary drug name (USP format)	Common chemical name	Acronym	Comments
technetium Tc 99m lidofenin	hepatobiliary iminodiacetic acid; dimethyl-iminodiacetic acid	HIDA	An early and widely used tracer; not used as much anymore, as others have progressively replaced it, but the term "HIDA scan" is sometimes used even when another tracer was involved, being treated as a catch-all synonym.
technetium Tc 99m iprofenin	paraisopropyl-iminodiacetic acid	PIPIDA	
technetium Tc 99m disofenin	diisopropyl-iminodiacetic acid	DISIDA	
technetium Tc 99m mebrofenin	trimethylbromo-iminodiacetic acid	BrIDA	
	diethyl-iminodiacetic acid	EIDA	Seems to have been a laboratory tracer but never widely used clinically
	parabutyl-iminodiacetic acid	PBIDA	Seems to have been a laboratory tracer but never widely used clinically
		BIDA	Seems to have been a laboratory tracer but never widely used clinically
		DIDA	Seems to have been a laboratory tracer but never widely used clinically
