= Nitrilotriacetic acid =

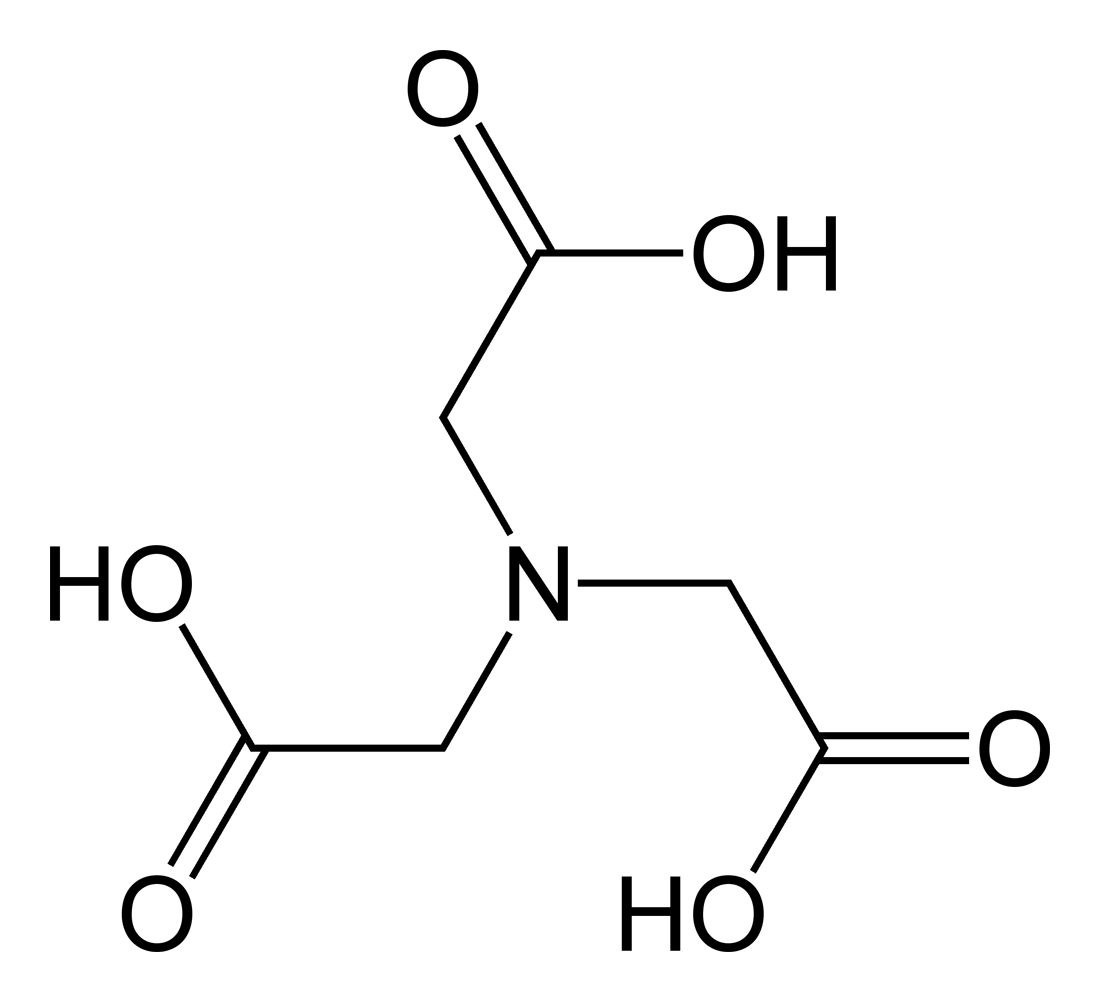
- Skeletal formula of nitrilotriacetic acid

Names
- Preferred IUPAC name 2,2′,2′′-Nitrilotriacetic acid
- Other names N,N-Bis(carboxymethyl)glycine; 2-[Bis(carboxymethyl)amino]acetic acid Triglycine Trilon

Identifiers
CAS Number	139-13-9 (free acid); 5064-31-3 (trisodium salt)
3D model (JSmol)	Interactive image
Beilstein Reference	1710776
ChEBI	CHEBI:44557
ChemSpider	8428
DrugBank	DB03040
ECHA InfoCard	100.004.869
EC Number	205-355-7
Gmelin Reference	3726
KEGG	C14695
MeSH	Nitrilotriacetic+Acid
PubChem CID	8758
RTECS number	AJ0175000
UNII	KA90006V9D; E3C8R2M0XD (trisodium salt)
UN number	2811
CompTox Dashboard (EPA)	DTXSID6020939
- InChI: InChI=1S/C6H9NO6/c8-4(9)1-7(2-5(10)11)3-6(12)13/h1-3H2,(H,8,9)(H,10,11)(H,12,13) Key: MGFYIUFZLHCRTH-UHFFFAOYSA-N
- SMILES: O=C(O)CN(CC(=O)O)CC(=O)O

Properties
Chemical formula	C_{6}H_{9}NO_{6}
Molar mass	191.14
Appearance	White crystals
Melting point	246 °C (475 °F; 519 K)
Solubility in water	Insoluble. <0.01 g/100 mL at 23°C

Thermochemistry
Std enthalpy of formation (Δ_{f}H^{⦵}_{298})	−1.3130–−1.3108 MJ mol^{−1}

Hazards
- GHS labelling
Pictograms	(GHS07: Exclamation mark) (GHS08: Health hazard)
Signal word	Warning
Hazard statements	H302, H319, H351
Precautionary statements	P281, P305+P351+P338
Flash point	100 °C (212 °F; 373 K)
- Lethal dose or concentration (LD, LC)
LD_{50} (median dose)	1.1 g kg^{−1} (oral, rat)

Related compounds
Related alkanoic acids	EDTA; Iminodiacetic acid; EDDS
Related compounds	Triethanolamine; Tris(2-aminoethyl)amine
- Except where otherwise noted, data are given for materials in their standard state (at 25 °C [77 °F], 100 kPa). verify (what is ?) Infobox references

Nitrilotriacetic acid (NTA) is the aminopolycarboxylic acid with the formula N(CH_{2}CO_{2}H)_{3}. It is a colourless solid. Its conjugate base nitrilotriacetate is used as a chelating agent for Ca^{2+}, Co^{2+}, Cu^{2+}, and Fe^{3+}.

== Production and use ==
Nitrilotriacetic acid is commercially available as the free acid and as the sodium salt. It is produced from ammonia, formaldehyde, and sodium cyanide or hydrogen cyanide. NTA is also cogenerated as an impurity in the synthesis of EDTA, arising from reactions of the ammonia coproduct. Older routes to NTA included alkylation of ammonia with chloroacetic acid and oxidation of triethanolamine.

== Coordination chemistry and applications ==
The conjugate base of NTA is a tripodal tetradentate trianionic ligand, forming coordination compounds with a variety of metal ions.

Like EDTA, its sodium salt is used for water softening to remove Ca^{2+}. For this purpose, NTA is a replacement for triphosphate, which once was widely used in detergents, and cleansers, but can cause eutrophication of lakes.

In one application, sodium NTA removes Cr, Cu, and As from wood that had been treated with chromated copper arsenate.

=== Laboratory uses ===
In the laboratory, this compound is used in complexometric titrations. A variant of NTA is used for protein isolation and purification in the His-tag method. The modified NTA is used to immobilize nickel on a solid support. This allows purification of proteins containing a tag consisting of six histidine residues at either terminus.

The His-tag binds the metal of metal chelator complexes. Previously, iminodiacetic acid was used for that purpose. Now, nitrilotriacetic acid is more commonly used.

For laboratory uses, Ernst Hochuli et al. (1987) coupled the NTA ligand and nickel ions to agarose beads. This Ni-NTA Agarose is the most used tool to purify His-tagged proteins via affinity chromatography.

NTA complexes

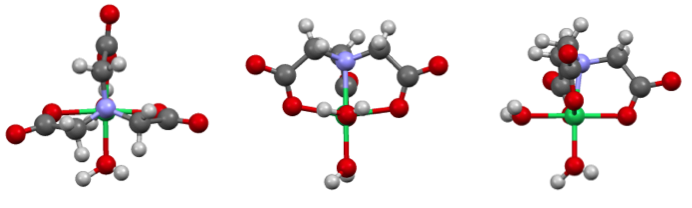
Three views of the structure of [Ni(NTA)(H_{2}O)_{2}]^{−}.

Structure of the nitrilotriacetate anion [Ca(NTA)(H_{2}O)_{3}]^{−}.

== Toxicity and environment ==
In contrast to EDTA, NTA is easily biodegradable and is almost completely removed during wastewater treatment. The environmental impacts of NTA are minimal. Despite widespread use in cleaning products, the concentration in the water supply is too low to have a sizeable impact on human health or environmental quality.

== Related compounds ==
- N-Methyliminodiacetic acid (MIDA), the N-methyl derivative of IDA
- Imidodiacetic acid, the amino diacetic acid
- N-(2-Carboxyethyl)iminodiacetic acid, a more biodegradable analogue of NTA
- N-hydroxyiminodiacetic acid (HIDA), HON(CH_{2}CO_{2}H)_{2} (registry number = 87339-38-6) See HIDA scan.
