= TPA =

TPA may refer to:

== Business and finance ==
- Third-party access, a competition principle regarding natural resources
- Third-party administrator for processing insurance claims and retirement plans
- Tonnes per annum
- Tons per acre, wine grape production term for estimating yield

== Law ==
- Trade Practices Act 1974, Australian competition law legislation
- Trade Promotion Authority, a power of the US president

== Organisations ==
- Political Union of Economists (Latvian: Tautsaimnieku Politiskā Apvienība), former Latvian political party
- TaxPayers' Alliance, a British free-market lobby group
- Tempe Preparatory Academy, a preparatory secondary school in Arizona, U.S.
- Texas Pharmacy Association, U.S.
- Theta Phi Alpha a collegiate women's fraternity. Formerly known as TPA, now Theta Phi Alpha.
- Travelers Protective Association of America

== Science and medicine ==
- Terephthalic acid, an aromatic acid and monomer used in many plastics
- Tetradecanoyl phorbol acetate (12-O-Tetradecanoylphorbol-13-acetate), a tumor promoter drug
- Tissue-type plasminogen activator (tPA), a fibrinolytic enzyme in biochemistry and medicine
- Transpalatal arch, an orthodontic device
- Tris(2-pyridylmethyl)amine
- Two-photon absorption

== Television ==
- Televisão Pública de Angola, the state-owned TV station in Angola
- Televisión Pública Argentina, a television network in Argentina
- Television Programs of America, a television production company of the 1950s
- Televisión del Principado de Asturias, broadcaster in Asturias, Spain

== Transport ==
- Tampa International Airport, by IATA code
- Tanzania Ports Authority
- Toronto Parking Authority, Canada
- Toronto Port Authority, Canada

== Other ==
- Taipei Assassins, a Taiwanese esports team
- Terapascal (TPa), a unit of pressure or stiffness
- Terminal Portuario de Arica, an important port in northern Chile
- The Pinball Arcade, a pinball video game developed by FarSight Studios
- Thermal Protective Aid, an aluminized polyethylene suit
- Thickened pyrophoric agent, triethylaluminium used as an incendiary weapon
- Third-party authentication, term usually applied to an app which enables a type of multi-factor authentication
- TPA Tour, name for the US golf PGA Tour for a few months in 1981–82
- Trade Practices Act 1974, the predecessor to the Competition and Consumer Act 2010, Australian legislation
- Transient program area, in a CP/M computer system
