= C6H15N3 =

The molecular formula C_{6}H_{15}N_{3} (molar mass: 129.2 g/mol) may refer to:

- Acetaldehyde ammonia trimer
- Aminoethylpiperazine
- cis,cis-1,3,5-Triaminocyclohexane
- 1,4,7-Triazacyclononane
- 1,3,5-Trimethyl-1,3,5-triazacyclohexane
