= C6H5NO =

The molecular formula C_{6}H_{5}NO (molar mass: 107.11 g/mol, exact mass: 107.0371 u) may refer to:

- Pyridine-2-carbaldehyde
- Pyridine-3-carbaldehyde
- Pyridine-4-carbaldehyde
- Nitrosobenzene
