= Hexahydro-1,3,5-triazine =

Class of chemical compounds

Structure of a trisubstituted hexahydrotriazine

In chemistry, hexahydro-1,3,5-triazine is a class of heterocyclic compounds with the formula (CH_{2}NR)_{3}. Known as aldehyde ammonias, these compounds characteristically crystallize with water. They are reduced derivatives of 1,3,5-triazine, which have the formula (CHN)_{3}, a family of aromatic heterocycles.

They are also called triazacyclohexanes or TACHs, but this acronym is also applied to cis,cis-1,3,5-triaminocyclohexane.

== Preparation ==
N,N',N''-trisubstituted hexahydro-1,3,5-triazines arise from the condensation of a primary amine and formaldehyde as illustrated by the route to 1,3,5-trimethyl-1,3,5-triazacyclohexane...

3 CH_{2}O + 3 H_{2}NMe → (CH_{2}NMe)_{3} + 3 H_{2}O

...or using N,N-dimethyl-para-phenylenediamine and paraformaldehyde:

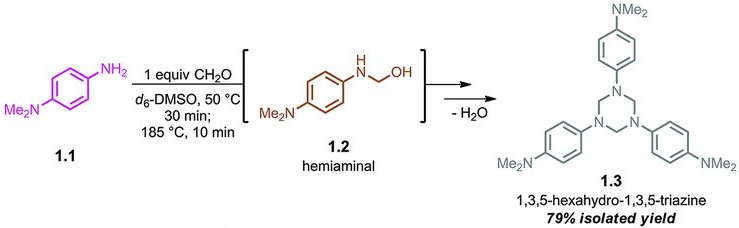

The C-substituted derivatives are obtained by reaction of aldehydes and ammonia:

3 RCHO + 3 NH_{3} → (RCHNH)_{3} + 3 H_{2}O

1-Alkanolamines are intermediates in these condensation reactions.

RDX, an explosive, is a hexahydro-1,3,5-triazine.

The parent hexahydro-1,3,5-triazine (CH_{2}NH)_{3} has been detected as an intermediate in the condensation of formaldehyde and ammonia, but the reaction continues to hexamethylene tetraamine.

The N,N',N"-triacyltriazines are trizines with acyl groups attached to the three nitrogen centers of the ring. These triacyltriazines arise from the reaction of hexamethylene tetraamine with acid chlorides or the condensation of amides with formaldehyde.

== Structure ==
Unlike the parent triazines, the hexahydro derivatives are conformationally flexible.

== Related compounds and derivatives ==
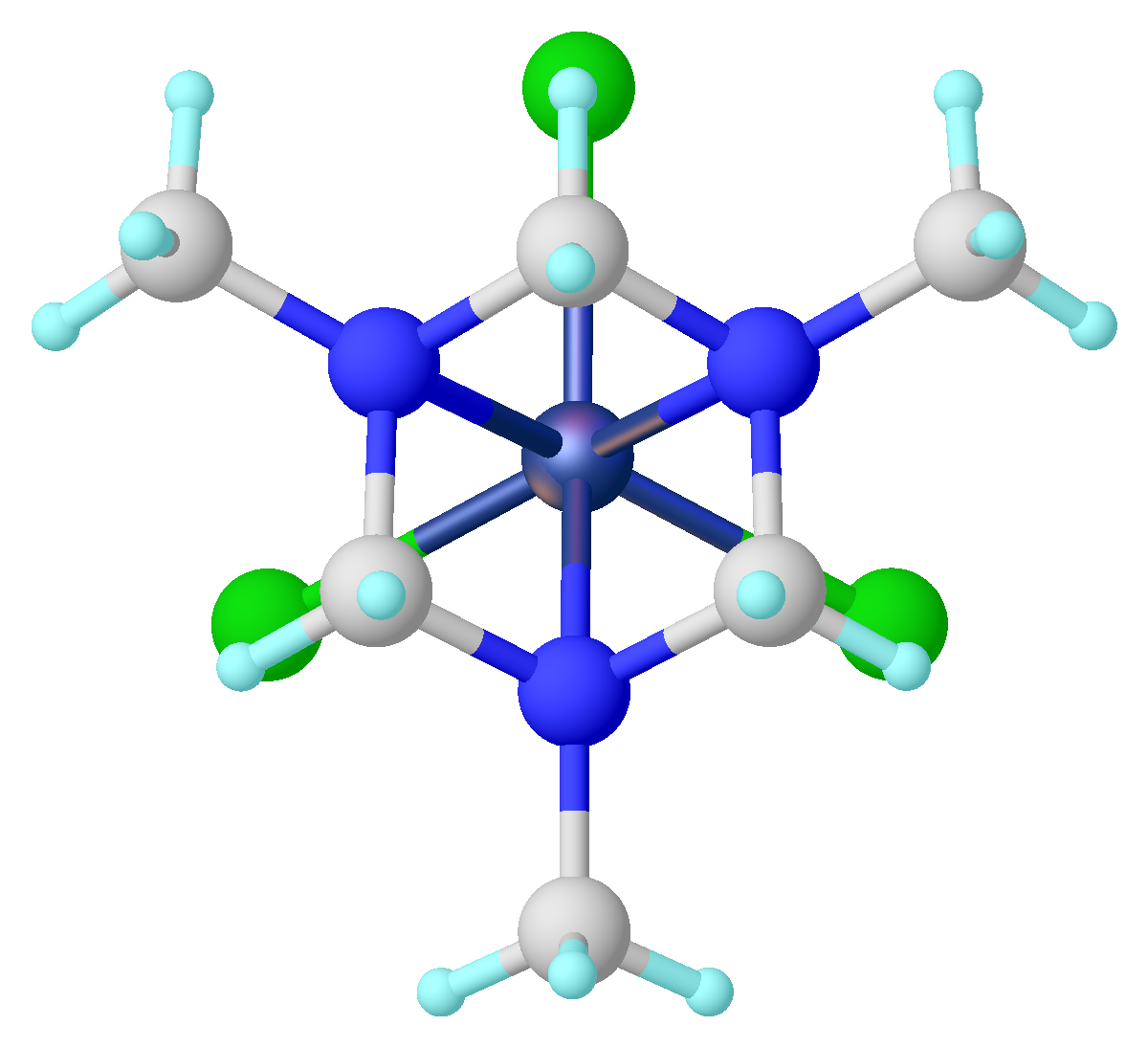
Structure of (Me_{3}TACH)ScCl_{3} viewed down the three-fold symmetry axis (color scheme: blue = N, green = Cl, gray = C).

Trimers of isocyanates are sometimes labeled as 2,4,6-trioxohexahydro-1,3,5-triazines. They have the formula (RNC(O))_{3} and based on the isocyanuric (trione) tautomer of cyanuric acid.

The N,N',N"-hexahydro-1,3,5-triazines function as tridentate ligands, which are called TACH (triazacyclohexanes). Examples include Mo(CO)_{3}[(CH_{2})_{3}(NMe)_{3}] formed from the TACH ligand and molybdenum hexacarbonyl.

Hexahydro-1,3,5-triazine polymers have also been synthesized.
