= Triphos =

Triphos refers to two distinct organophosphorus compounds:

- 1,1,1-Tris(diphenylphosphinomethyl)ethane
- Bis(diphenylphosphinoethyl)phenylphosphine
