= C2H5N =

The molecular formula C_{2}H_{5}N (molar mass: 43.07 g/mol, exact mass: 43.0422 u) can refer to:

- Aziridine
- Ethanimine or its tautomer, vinylamine
- N-Methylmethanimine
