= C12H13N3 =

The molecular formula C_{12}H_{13}N_{3} (molar mass: 199.25 g/mol, exact mass: 199.1109 u) may refer to:

- Dipicolylamine
- Gapicomine
- Pyrimethanil
- Diaza-2C-DFLY
