= Kläui ligand =

The Kläui ligand is the anion {(C_{5}H_{5})Co[(CH_{3}O)_{2}PO]_{3}}^{−}. The ligand, popularized by Wolfgang Kläui, binds metals and metalloids via a facial O_{3} donor set. Related tridentate and tripodal anionic ligands include trispyrazolylborates.

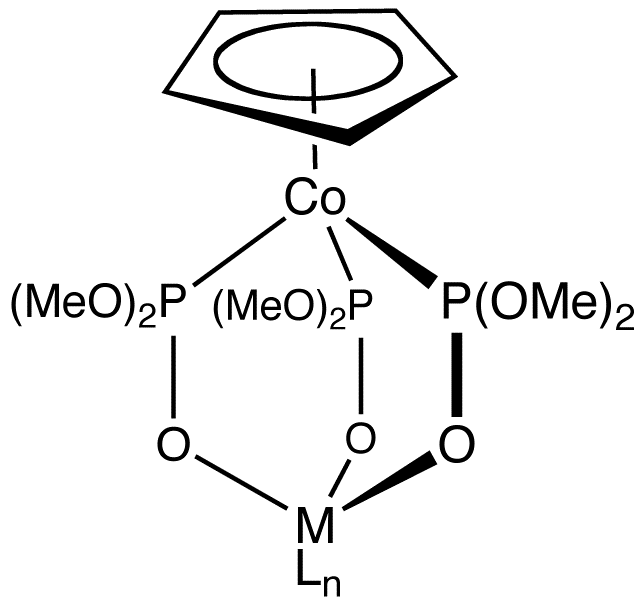
General structure of a metal center (ML_{n}) coordinated to a κ^{3}-Kläui ligand.

The ligand is derived from the cationic complex of trimethylphosphite {(C_{5}H_{5})Co[P(OCH_{3})_{3}]_{3}}^{2+} via an Arbuzov reaction. Using other phosphites and other cyclopentadienyl ligands, a large variety of derivatives are possible. The parent acid {(C_{5}H_{5})Co[(CH_{3}O)_{2}PO]_{3}}H is highly soluble in water (270 g/100 mL). Its pK_{a} is about 2. Many complexes have been described, including bis(chelate) complexes of the type {M[{(C_{5}H_{5})Co[(CH_{3}O)_{2}PO]_{3}}_{2}]^{n+} (M = Co(II), Mn(II), Bi(III), etc.).
