= CNH3 =

CNH3 may refer to:

- Methylene imine, chemical formula CNH_{3}
- Durham (Mulock) Airport, formerly TC LID: CNH3
