= Bis(diphenylphosphinoethyl)phenylphosphine =

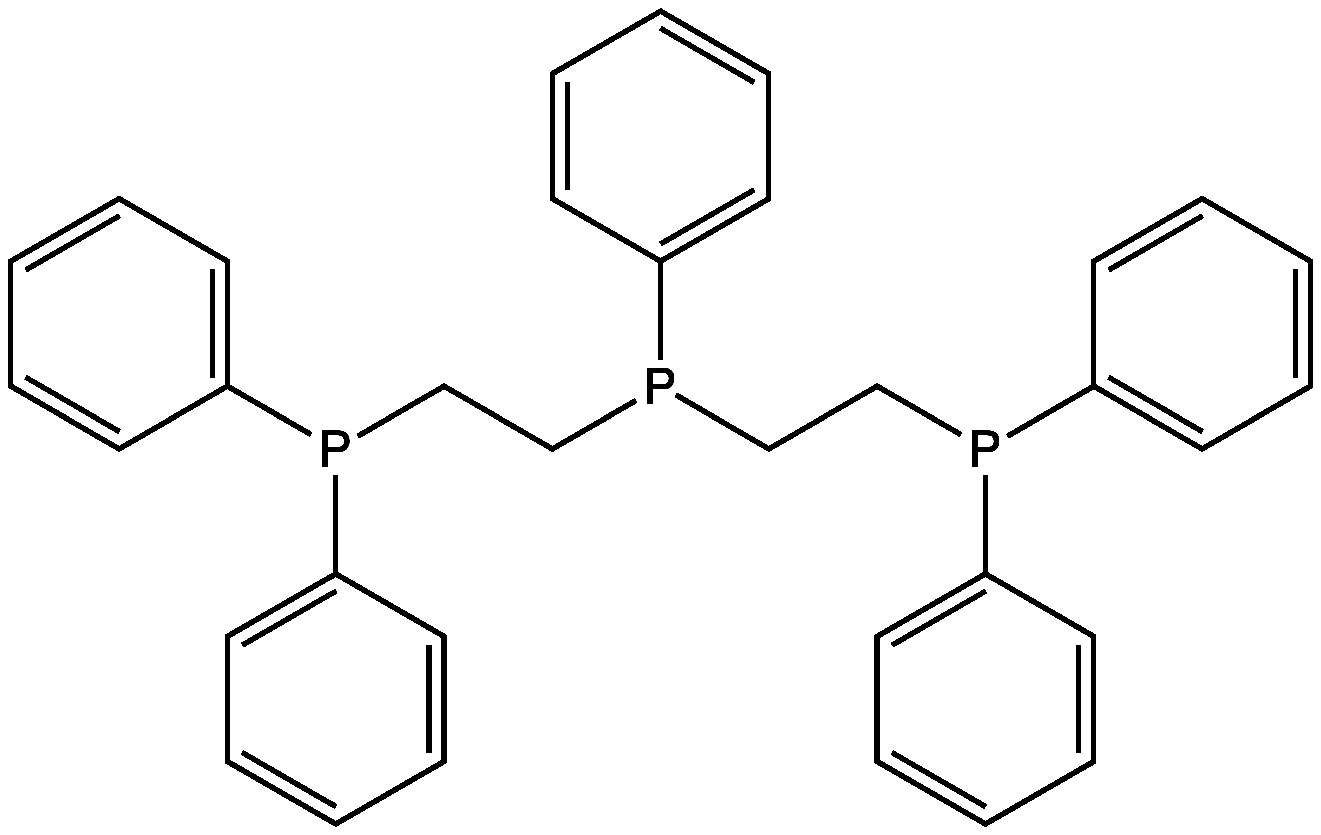

Names
- Preferred IUPAC name [(Phenylphosphanediyl)di(ethane-2,1-diyl)]bis(diphenylphosphane)
- Other names Triphos

Identifiers
CAS Number	23582-02-7
3D model (JSmol)	Interactive image
ChEMBL	ChEMBL69711
ChemSpider	81424
ECHA InfoCard	100.041.579
EC Number	245-753-8
PubChem CID	90192
UNII	RL599PNU27
CompTox Dashboard (EPA)	DTXSID70178220
- InChI: InChI=1S/C34H33P3/c1-6-16-30(17-7-1)35(26-28-36(31-18-8-2-9-19-31)32-20-10-3-11-21-32)27-29-37(33-22-12-4-13-23-33)34-24-14-5-15-25-34/h1-25H,26-29H2 Key: AXVOAMVQOCBPQT-UHFFFAOYSA-N; InChI=1/C34H33P3/c1-6-16-30(17-7-1)35(26-28-36(31-18-8-2-9-19-31)32-20-10-3-11-21-32)27-29-37(33-22-12-4-13-23-33)34-24-14-5-15-25-34/h1-25H,26-29H2 Key: AXVOAMVQOCBPQT-UHFFFAOYAR
- SMILES: C1=CC=C(C=C1)P(CCP(C2=CC=CC=C2)C3=CC=CC=C3)CCP(C4=CC=CC=C4)C5=CC=CC=C5

Properties
Chemical formula	C_{34}H_{29}P_{3}
Molar mass	534.55 g/mol
Appearance	white crystals
Melting point	129 to 130 °C (264 to 266 °F; 402 to 403 K)
Solubility in water	Insoluble

Hazards
- GHS labelling
Pictograms	(GHS07: Exclamation mark)
Signal word	Warning
Hazard statements	H315, H319, H335
Precautionary statements	P261, P264, P271, P280, P302+P352, P304+P340, P305+P351+P338, P312, P321, P332+P313, P337+P313, P362, P403+P233, P405, P501
- Except where otherwise noted, data are given for materials in their standard state (at 25 °C [77 °F], 100 kPa). verify (what is ?) Infobox references

Bis(diphenylphosphinoethyl)phenylphosphine is the organophosphorus compound with the formula [Ph_{2}PCH_{2}CH_{2}]_{2}PPh (Ph = C_{6}H_{5}). It is an air-sensitive white solid that function as tridentate ligands in coordination and organometallic chemistry.

It is prepared by the free-radical-catalysed addition of phenylphosphine to vinyldiphenylphosphine:

2 Ph_{2}PCH=CH_{2} + H_{2}PPh → [Ph_{2}PCH_{2}CH_{2}]_{2}PPh

It can bind to an octahedral metal center to give either a facial or meridional isomers. Some derivatives are square planar complexes of the type [MX(triphos)]^{+} (M = Ni, Pd, Pt; X = halide).

== Related ligands ==
- diethylenetriamine (HN(CH_{2}CH_{2}NH_{2})_{2})
- bis(diphenylphosphinophenyl)phenylphosphine (PhP(C_{6}H_{4}PPh_{2})_{2})
- 1,1,1-Tris(diphenylphosphinomethyl)ethane, a tripodal ligand.
