= PHT =

PHT can stand for:

- Philippine Time
- Pulmonary hypertension
- Pseudo-Hadamard transform
- Prefix Hash Tree
- Polyhexahydrotriazine
- Postmenopausal hormone therapy
- Phenytoin
