= Hydrogenation of carbon–nitrogen double bonds =

In chemistry, the hydrogenation of carbon–nitrogen double bonds is the addition of the elements of dihydrogen (H_{2}) across a carbon–nitrogen double bond, forming amines or amine derivatives. Although a variety of general methods have been developed for the enantioselective hydrogenation of ketones, methods for the hydrogenation of carbon–nitrogen double bonds are less general. Hydrogenation of imines is complicated by both syn/anti isomerization and tautomerization to enamines, which may be hydrogenated with low enantioselectivity in the presence of a chiral catalyst. Additionally, the substituent attached to nitrogen affects both the reactivity and spatial properties of the imine, complicating the development of a general catalyst system for imine hydrogenation. Despite these challenges, methods have been developed that address particular substrate classes, such as N-aryl, N-alkyl, and endocyclic imines.

If the complex is chiral and non-racemic and the substrate is prochiral, an excess of a single enantiomer of a chiral product can result.

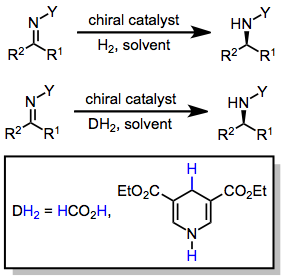

== Mechanism and stereochemistry ==
Hydrogen for the reduction of C=N double bond can either be provided by hydrogen gas (H_{2}) or transferred from sources of H_{2}, such as alcohols and formic acid. The process is usually catalyzed by transition metal complexes. For metal catalyzed reactions, the transfer of H_{2} to the imine can proceed by either inner sphere or outer sphere mechanisms.

=== Inner sphere mechanisms ===
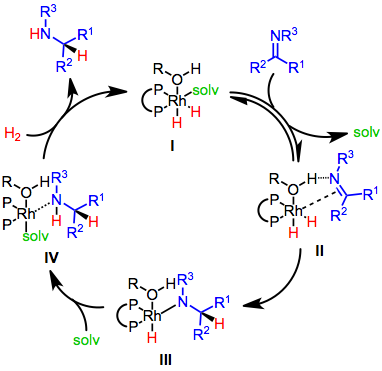
Inner-sphere mechanism proposed for the hydrogenation of imines

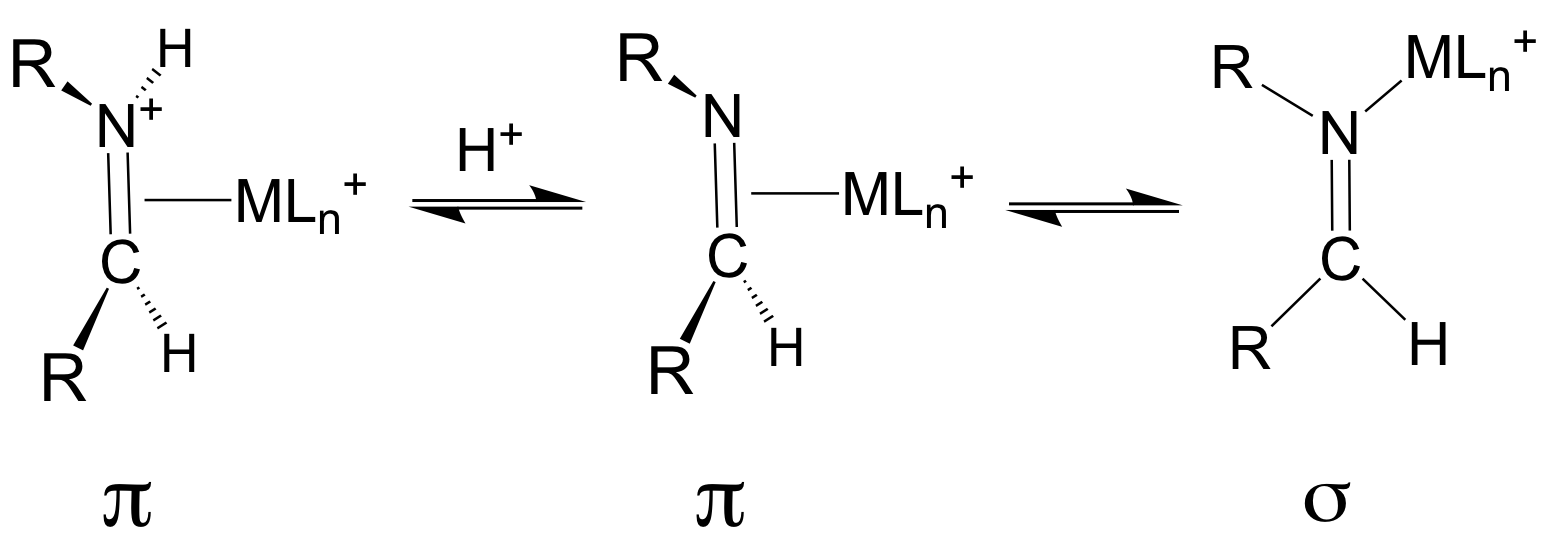
Coordination modes for a cis-aldimine

Relevant to the inner sphere mechanism are the two modes by which imines can coordinate, as a π or as a σ-donor ligand. The pi-imines are also susceptible to conversion to iminium ligands upon N-protonation. The binding mode for the imine is unclear, both η^{1} (σ-type) and η^{2} (π-type). The final step in the mechanism is release of the amine. In some iridium-catalyzed hydrogenations, the mechanism is believed to proceed via a monohydride species. The oxidation state of iridium is always +3. Examples:

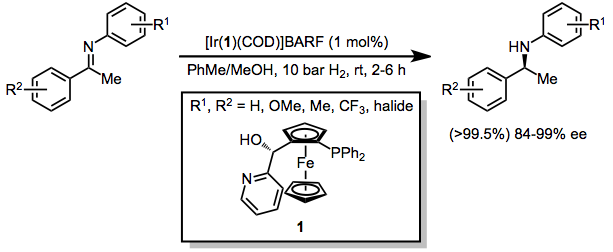
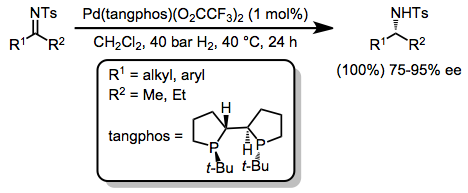
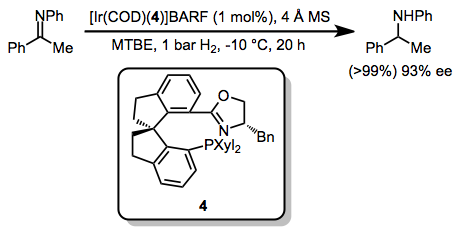

=== Outer sphere mechanisms ===
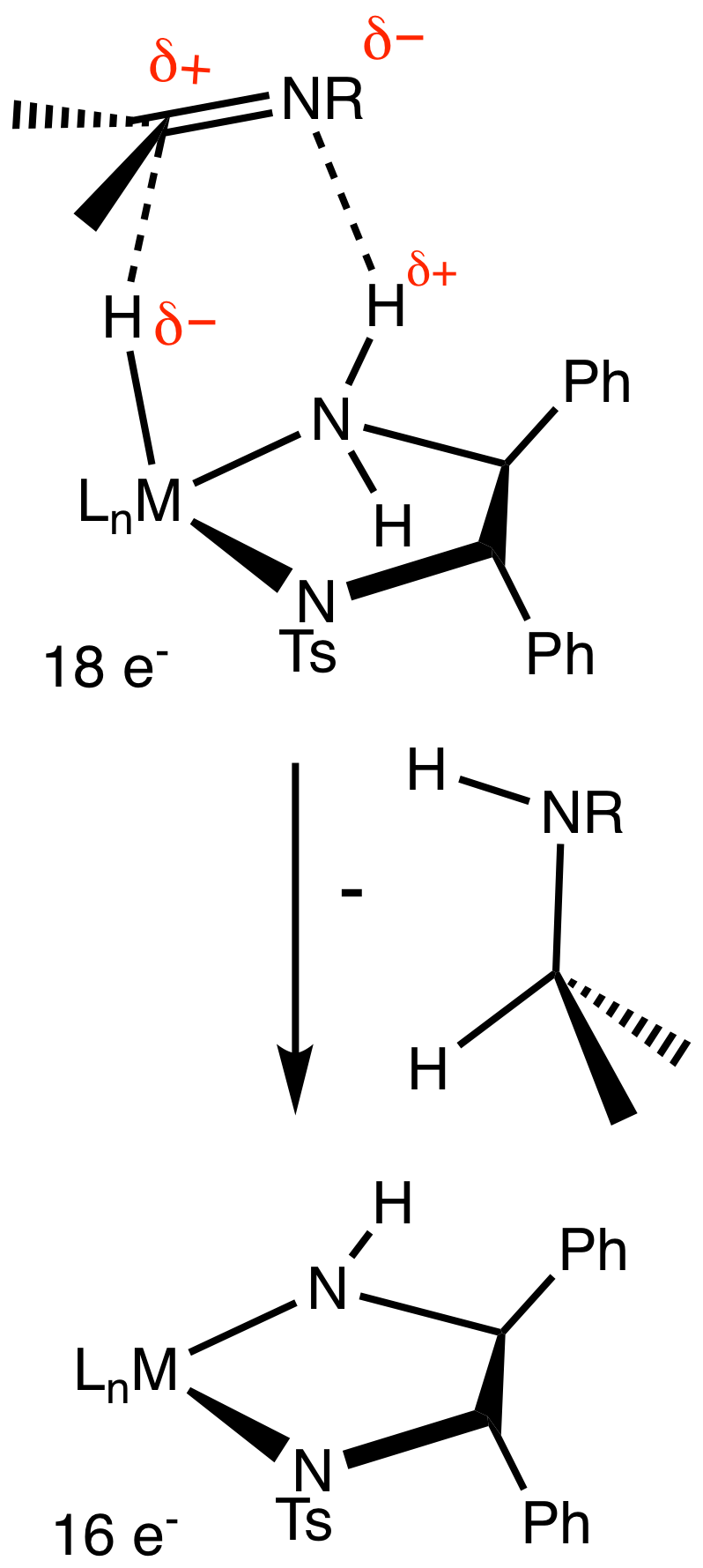
Outer sphere mechanism for metal-catalyzed transfer hydrogenation of an imine.)

Ruthenium(II) complexes of amine ligands are known for engaging in the outer-sphere mechanism, during which the imine/iminium substrate does not bind to the metal center directly. Instead, substrate receives the elements of H_{2} by interaction with Ru-H and N-H sites. This process is utilized by the Shvo catalyst and many ruthenium amine complexes. One such complex is Baratta's catalyst RuCl_{2}(PPh_{3})_{2}(ampy) (ampy = 2-picolylamine) for transfer hydrogenation.

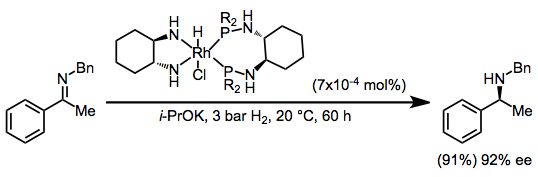
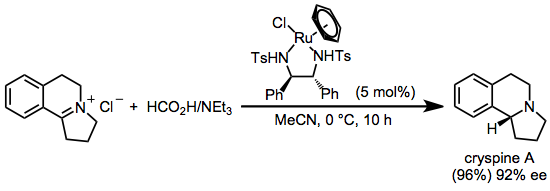

== Metal-free hydrogenations ==
Because the substituents attached to the imine nitrogen exert a profound influence on reactivity, few general catalyst systems exist for the enantioselective hydrogenation of imines and imine derivatives. However, catalyst systems have been developed that catalyze hydrogenation of particular classes of imines with high enantioselectivity and yield. This section describes some of these systems and is organized by the substitution pattern of the imine.

α-Carboxy imines are attractive precursors for α-amino acids. Organocatalytic reduction of these substrates is possible using a Hantzsch ester and a chiral phosphoric acid catalyst.

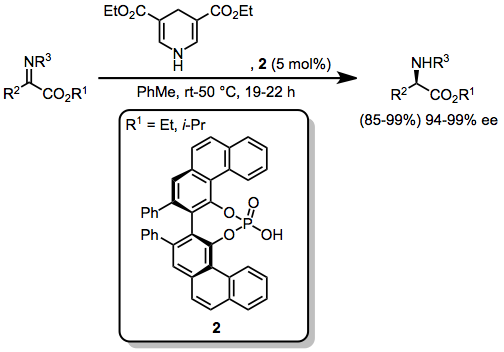

== Applications ==
Imine hydrogenation provides a practical route to chiral amines. Metolachlor is the active ingredient in the widely used herbicide Dual Magnum. A key step in its industrial production involves the enantioselective reduction of an N-aryl imine. This reduction is achieved with extremely high turnover number (albeit moderate enantioselectivity) through the use of a specialized catalyst system consisting of [Ir(COD)Cl]_{2}, modified Josiphos ligand 3, and acid and iodide additives.

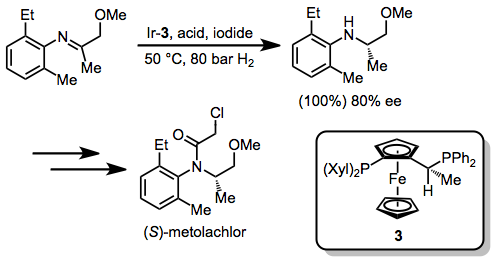

== Comparison with other methods ==
Imines may be reduced enantioselectively using stoichiometric amounts of chiral metal hydrides. Such methods have the advantage that they are easy to implement. Reduction with hydrosilanes is a second alternative to transition-metal catalyzed hydrogenation.
