= 1,1,1-Tris(diphenylphosphinomethyl)ethane =

Names
- Preferred IUPAC name {2-[(Diphenylphosphanyl)methyl]-2-methylpropane-1,3-diyl}bis(diphenylphosphane)
- Other names Triphos; tdppme; tdme

Identifiers
CAS Number	22031-12-5
3D model (JSmol)	Interactive image
ChemSpider	375165
ECHA InfoCard	100.241.729
EC Number	811-359-5
PubChem CID	423856
CompTox Dashboard (EPA)	DTXSID40329787
- InChI: InChI=1S/C41H39P3/c1-41(32-42(35-20-8-2-9-21-35)36-22-10-3-11-23-36,33-43(37-24-12-4-13-25-37)38-26-14-5-15-27-38)34-44(39-28-16-6-17-29-39)40-30-18-7-19-31-40/h2-31H,32-34H2,1H3 Key: BARUNXKDFNLHEV-UHFFFAOYSA-N; InChI=1/C41H39P3/c1-41(32-42(35-20-8-2-9-21-35)36-22-10-3-11-23-36,33-43(37-24-12-4-13-25-37)38-26-14-5-15-27-38)34-44(39-28-16-6-17-29-39)40-30-18-7-19-31-40/h2-31H,32-34H2,1H3 Key: BARUNXKDFNLHEV-UHFFFAOYAL
- SMILES: CC(CP(C1=CC=CC=C1)C2=CC=CC=C2)(CP(C3=CC=CC=C3)C4=CC=CC=C4)CP(C5=CC=CC=C5)C6=CC=CC=C6

Properties
Chemical formula	C_{41}H_{39}P_{3}
Molar mass	624.67 g/mol
Appearance	white crystals
Melting point	99 to 102 °C (210 to 216 °F; 372 to 375 K)
Solubility in water	Insoluble

Hazards
- GHS labelling
Pictograms	(GHS07: Exclamation mark)
Signal word	Warning
Hazard statements	H315, H319, H335
Precautionary statements	P261, P264, P271, P280, P302+P352, P304+P340, P305+P351+P338, P312, P321, P332+P313, P337+P313, P362, P403+P233, P405, P501
Safety data sheet (SDS)	Triphos MSDS
- Except where otherwise noted, data are given for materials in their standard state (at 25 °C [77 °F], 100 kPa). Infobox references

1,1,1-Tris(diphenylphosphinomethyl)ethane, also called Triphos, is an organophosphorus compound with the formula CH_{3}C[CH_{2}PPh_{2}]_{3}. An air-sensitive white solid, it is a tripodal ligand ("three-legged") of idealized C_{3v} symmetry. It was originally prepared by the reaction of sodium diphenylphosphide and CH_{3}C(CH_{2}Cl)_{3}:

3 Ph_{2}PNa + CH_{3}C(CH_{2}Cl)_{3} → CH_{3}C[CH_{2}PPh_{2}]_{3} + 3 NaCl

It forms complexes with many transition metals, usually as a tripodal ligand. Such complexes are used to analyze mechanistic aspects of homogeneous catalysts. For example, rhodium forms complexes with CH_{3}C[CH_{2}PPh_{2}]_{3} like [(triphos)RhCl(C_{2}H_{4})], [(triphos)RhH(C_{2}H_{4})], and [(triphos)Rh(C_{2}H_{5})(C_{2}H_{4})], provide model intermediates in the catalytic cycle for hydrogenation of alkenes.

Triphos sometimes behaves as a bidentate ligand. Illustrative cases include fac-[Mn(CO)_{3}Br(η^{2}-triphos)] and [M(CO)_{4}(η^{2}-triphos)], where M is Cr, Mo, or W. Triphos serves as a tridentate-bridging ligand in an icosahedral Au_{13} cluster. The phosphine bridges three chlorogold(I) groups to form the tripod molecule of trichloro-1,1,1-(diphenylphosphinomethyl)ethanetrigold(I), CH_{3}C[CH_{2}PPh_{2}AuCl]_{3}.

== Related ligands ==
- Tris(aminomethyl)ethane, a tripodal triamine (CH_{3}C(CH_{2}NH_{2})_{3})
- Bis(diphenylphosphinoethyl)phenylphosphine (PhP(C_{2}H_{4}PPh_{2})_{2})
- Tris(2-diphenylphosphinoethyl)amine N[CH_{2}CH_{2}PPh_{2}]
