= Ethanimine =

Ethanimine / ethenamine
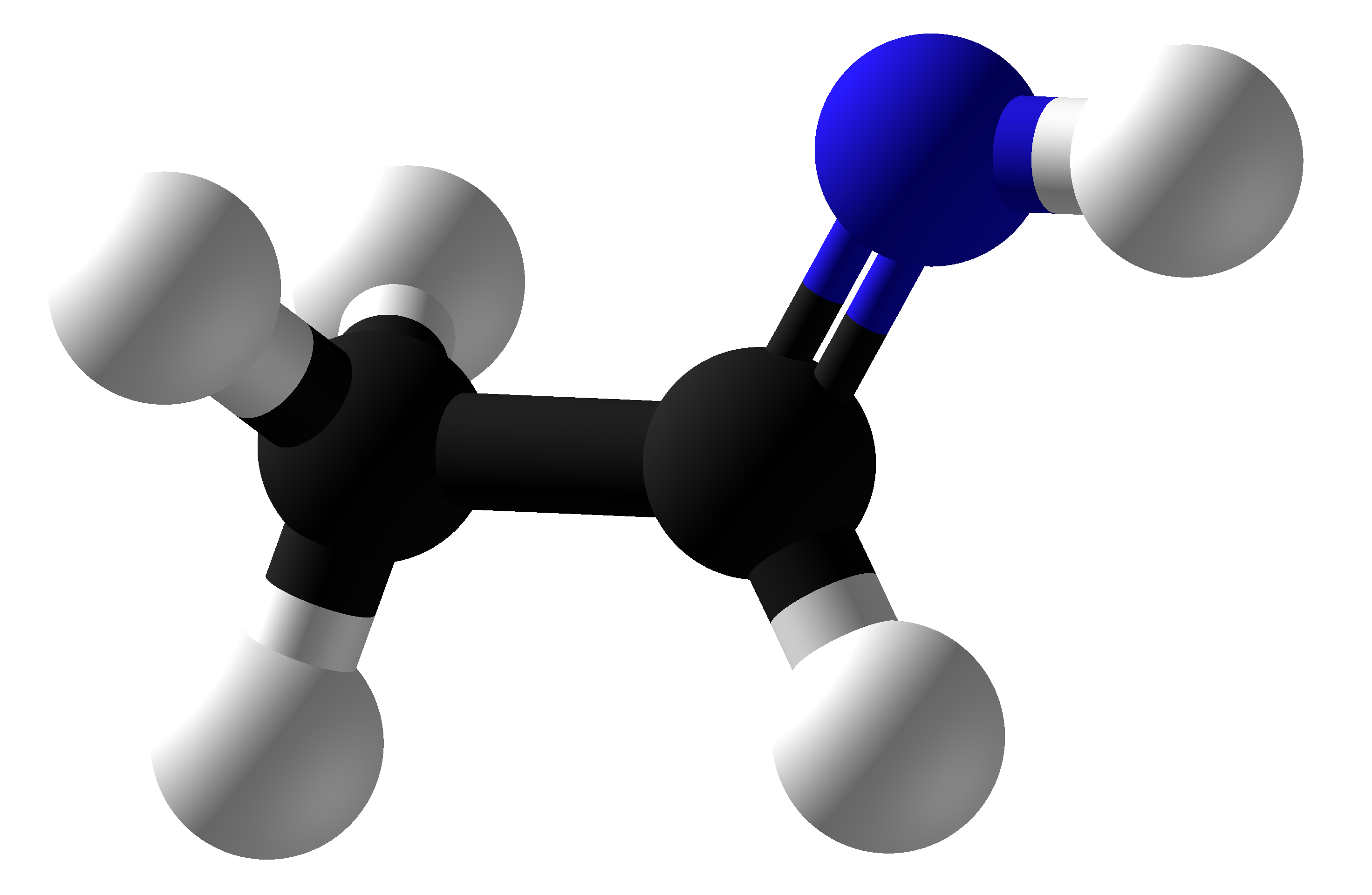

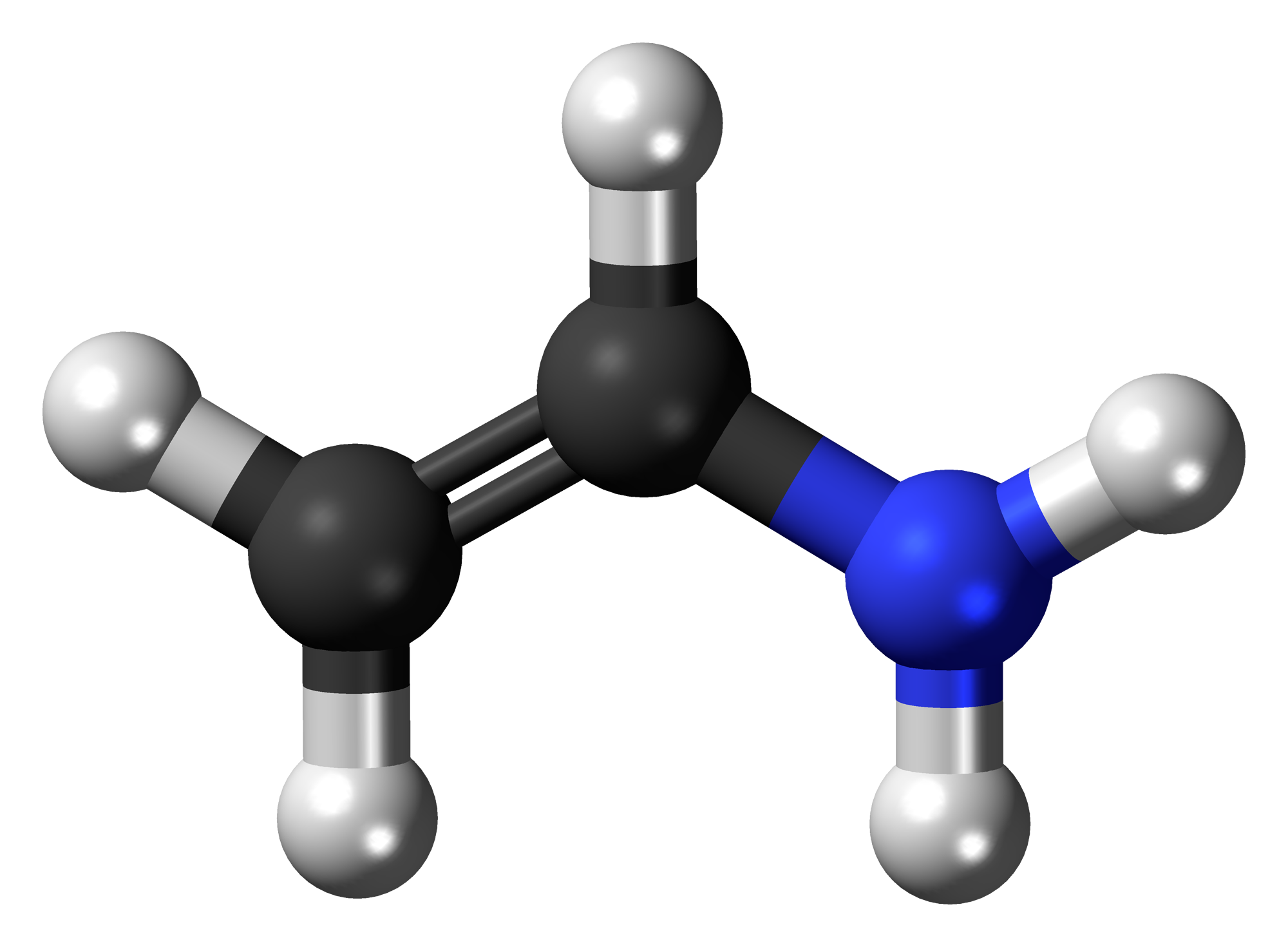

Names
- Preferred IUPAC name Ethanimine
- Other names As imine: ethylimine, ethylideneimine, ethylidenimine, acetaldehyde imine, acetaldehyde-ammonia Schiff base, acetaldimine, iminoethane As amine: ethenamine, ethyleneamine, ethylideneamine, aminoethylene, vinylamine, vinyl amine

Identifiers
| CAS Number | 20729-41-3 |
| 3D model (JSmol) | Interactive image |
| ChemSpider | 11539075 |
| PubChem CID | 140746 |
| CompTox Dashboard (EPA) | DTXSID20865279 |
- InChI: InChI=1S/C2H5N/c1-2-3/h2-3H,1H3 Key: MPAYEWNVIPXRDP-UHFFFAOYSA-N; InChI=1/C2H5N/c1-2-3/h2-3H,1H3 Key: MPAYEWNVIPXRDP-UHFFFAOYAR
- SMILES: CC=N

Properties
| Chemical formula | C_{2}H_{5}N |
| Molar mass | 43.069 g·mol^{−1} |

Related compounds
| Related compounds | N-Methylmethanimine; Methanimine |
- Except where otherwise noted, data are given for materials in their standard state (at 25 °C [77 °F], 100 kPa). Infobox references

Ethanimine is an organonitrogen compound classified as an imine. It is formed by reacting acetaldehyde and ammonia, but rapidly polymerizes to acetaldehyde ammonia trimer.

It has two tautomers: ethanimine, an imine, and ethenamine or aminoethylene, an amine. Ethanimine has a double bond between a carbon atom and the nitrogen atom, while ethenamine has one between the carbon atoms.

Ethanimine tautomers

== Occurrence ==
It is not well known terrestrially, but has been detected in abundance toward Sagittarius B2 (Sgr B2), a dense interstellar cloud between stars toward the Galactic Center of the Milky Way. The distance between the Sgr B2 cloud and center of galaxy is 100 pc (1 pc = 3.26 ly). Ethanimine is mainly found in hot cores of ISM clouds; in case of Sgr B2, the region would be the Sgr B2 N and Sgr B2 M. Radio telescopes such as the Green Bank Observatory's Green Bank Telescope and those operated by the National Radio Astronomy Observatory (measuring radio frequency light lambda ranging from 1–300 GHz) are able to detect organic molecules such as ethanimines because its internal energy transition, more specifically the rotational transition is within the radio frequency of 14085 MHz = 140.8 GHz.
