= N-Methylmethanimine =

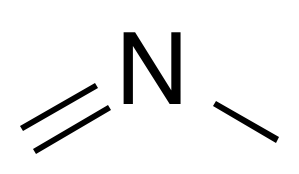

Names
- IUPAC name N-Methylmethanimine

Identifiers
CAS Number	1761-67-7
3D model (JSmol)	Interactive image
ChemSpider	120899
PubChem CID	137199
CompTox Dashboard (EPA)	DTXSID50170085
- InChI: InChI=1S/C2H5N/c1-3-2/h1H2,2H3 Key: NYVSDPNXBIEFPW-UHFFFAOYSA-N
- SMILES: CN=C

Properties
Chemical formula	C_{2}H_{5}N
Molar mass	43.069 g·mol^{−1}

Related compounds
Related compounds	dimethylamine Methanimine; Ethanimine
- Except where otherwise noted, data are given for materials in their standard state (at 25 °C [77 °F], 100 kPa). Infobox references

N-Methylmethanimine or N‐methyl methylenimine is a reactive molecular substance containing a methyl group attached to an imine. It can be written as CH_{3}N=CH_{2}. On a timescale of minutes it self reacts to form the trimer trimethyl 1,3,5-triazinane. N-Methylmethanimine is formed naturally in the Earth's atmosphere, by oxidation of dimethylamine and trimethylamine, both of which are produced by animals, or burning.

== Production ==
N-Methylmethanimine can be produced in two steps from dimethylamine, by first chlorinating the nitrogen atom with solid N-chlorosuccinimide, and then treating with potassium tert-butoxide at 90°C. Also it can be formed directly by thermal decomposition.

It can also be prepared from the trimer: 1,3,5-trimethyl-1,3,5-triazinane by heating to 450 °C (842 °F).

At 515 °C (959 °F), trimethylamine decomposes into methane and N-methylmethanimine.

== Natural occurrence ==
N-Methylmethanimine should be formed in the atmosphere as a result of degradation by oxidation of di- and trimethylamine. These occur at concentrations of a few parts per billion. But N-methylmethanimine cannot be detected. This is likely because it forms the trimer, gets absorbed onto particles, such as cloud droplets, and hydrolyses to form methylamine and formaldehyde.

== Properties ==
The N-Methylmethanimine molecule has Cs symmetry. The infrared spectrum and microwave spectrum have been observed.

The bond length for C=N is 1.279 Å, and for the N-C bond it is 1.458 Å. The ∠ C=N-C is 116.6°.

The electric dipole moment is 1.53 Debye.

When heated to 535°, N-methylmethanimine decomposes to hydrogen cyanide (HCN) and methane (CH_{4}).

Between 400 and 550°C, the cyclic amine, aziridine decomposes to a mixture of N-methylmethanimine and ethylideneimine.
