= Dipicolylamine =

Names
- Preferred IUPAC name 1-(Pyridin-2-yl)-N-[(pyridin-2-yl)methyl]methanamine
- Other names Di-(2-picolyl)amine, DPA

Identifiers
CAS Number	1539-42-0
3D model (JSmol)	Interactive image
ChemSpider	66400
ECHA InfoCard	100.014.788
PubChem CID	73759
UNII	P978WAD4KK
CompTox Dashboard (EPA)	DTXSID8061767
- InChI: InChI=1S/C12H13N3/c1-3-7-14-11(5-1)9-13-10-12-6-2-4-8-15-12/h1-8,13H,9-10H2 Key: KXZQYLBVMZGIKC-UHFFFAOYSA-N; InChI=1/C12H13N3/c1-3-7-14-11(5-1)9-13-10-12-6-2-4-8-15-12/h1-8,13H,9-10H2 Key: KXZQYLBVMZGIKC-UHFFFAOYAP
- SMILES: c1ccnc(c1)CNCc2ccccn2

Properties
Chemical formula	C_{12}H_{13}N_{3}
Molar mass	199.25
Appearance	yellow liquid
Density	1.107 g/cm^{3}
Boiling point	139 to 141 °C at 1 mmHg
Solubility in water	low
- Except where otherwise noted, data are given for materials in their standard state (at 25 °C [77 °F], 100 kPa). Infobox references

Dipicolylamine is an organic compound with the formula HN(CH_{2}C_{5}H_{4}N)_{2}. It is a yellow liquid that is soluble in polar organic solvents. The molecule is a secondary amine with two picolyl substituents. The compound is a common tridentate ligand in coordination chemistry.

The compound can be prepared by many methods, alkylation of picolinylamine with picolinyl chloride, deamination of picolinylamine, and reductive amination of picolinyl amine and pyridine-2-carboxaldehyde. It is commonly used to bind to bacteria in purifying mixtures that require separation.

== Related compounds ==
- Tris(2-pyridylmethyl)amine
