= Vinyldiphenylphosphine =

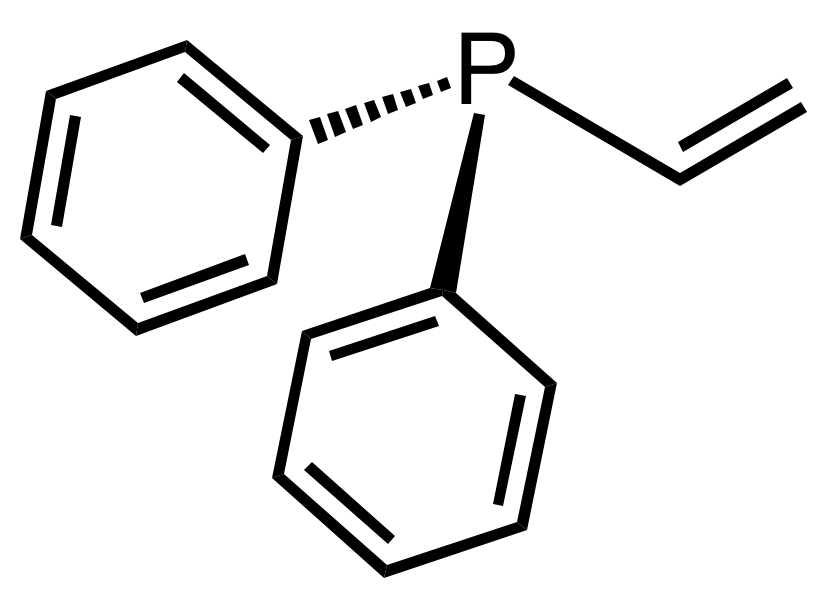

Names
- Preferred IUPAC name Ethenyldi(phenyl)phosphane
- Other names Diphenylvinylphosphine

Identifiers
CAS Number	2155-96-6
3D model (JSmol)	Interactive image
ChemSpider	67635
ECHA InfoCard	100.016.782
EC Number	218-459-2
PubChem CID	75083
UNII	HY2FYN4CVS
CompTox Dashboard (EPA)	DTXSID80175886
- InChI: InChI=1S/C14H13P/c1-2-15(13-9-5-3-6-10-13)14-11-7-4-8-12-14/h2-12H,1H2 Key: AJVBXLXLODZUME-UHFFFAOYSA-N
- SMILES: C=CP(C1=CC=CC=C1)C2=CC=CC=C2

Properties
Chemical formula	C_{14}H_{13}P
Molar mass	212.232 g·mol^{−1}
Appearance	colorless solid
Melting point	70.5–71.5 °C (158.9–160.7 °F; 343.6–344.6 K)
Boiling point	104 °C (219 °F; 377 K)
- Except where otherwise noted, data are given for materials in their standard state (at 25 °C [77 °F], 100 kPa). Infobox references

Vinyldiphenylphosphine is the organophosphorus compound with the formula (C_{6}H_{5})_{2}PCH=CH_{2}. This colorless, air-sensitive solid is used as a precursor to ligands used in coordination chemistry and homogeneous catalysis. It is prepared by treating chlorodiphenylphosphine with vinyl Grignard reagents.
