= Tridentate ligand =

Ligand with 3 acceptor atoms for a coordination complex

The iminodiacetic anion is a tridentate ligand forming a complex with a metal labelled "M"

A tridentate ligand (or terdentate ligand) is a ligand that has three atoms that can function as donor atoms in a coordination complex.

Well-known tridentate ligands include diethylenetriamine with three nitrogen donor atoms, and the iminodiacetate anion which consists of one deprotonated amine nitrogen and a pair of carboxylate groups.

An octahedrally coordinated atom has six positions around it. Two tridentate ligands may form a complex with such an atom. There are two possible arrangements for such a complex: fac where the coordination is in a triangle on one face of the octahedron, and mer where the coordinating atoms are in an arc around the central atom, with two atoms of the ligand opposite each other. Fac tridentate ligands are termed scorpionate ligands, especially in reference to polypyrazolylborates.

If the tridentate ligand is not symmetrical, then in the fac complexes in octahedral coordination there are three possible isomers. In the mer complexes there are two enantiomers, mirror images of each other.

== List ==
Name	Abbreviation	Chemical Formula	CAS Number	Shape	Type	Formal Charge	Central atoms	Structure
1,4,7-trioxonane	9-Crown-3	(C_{2}H_{4}O)_{3}	27725-91-3	ring	OOO	0	Li	
methyl Tm ligand	Tm^{Me}			tripod	S^{3}	1−	Li Na K	
Trispyrazolylborate	Tp^{−}			tripod	N^{3}	1−	K Ru U	
Tris(4,4-dimethyl-2-oxazolinyl)phenyl borate	To^{M}			tripod	N^{3}	1−		
Tris(4S-isopropyl-2-oxazolinyl)phenylborate	To^{P}			tripod	N^{3}	1−		
N,N,N′,N′′,N′′-pentamethyldiethylenetriamine	PMDTA	[(CH_{3})_{2}NCH_{2}CH_{2}]_{2}NCH_{3}	3030-47-5	linear	NNN	0 or +1	Li AlH_{2}	
Bis(diphenylphosphinoethyl)phenylphosphine	Triphos		23582-02-7	linear	PPP	0	transition metals	
1,4,7-Trithiacyclononane	9-ane-S3	(CH_{2}CH_{2}S)_{3}	6573-11-1	ring	SSS	0	Fe Cu	
1,4,7-Trimethyl-1,4,7-triazacyclononane	Me_{3}TACN	(CH_{2}CH_{2}N(CH_{3}))_{3}	96556-05-7	Ring	NNN	0	Re Mn Ru Cu Fe	
1,4,7-Triazacyclononane	TACN	(CH_{2}CH_{2}NH)_{3}	4730-54-5	Ring	NNN	0	Mo	
cis,cis-1,3,5-Triaminocyclohexane	tach	(CH_{2}CHNH_{2})_{3}	26150-46-9	tripod	N^{3}	0	Ni Mn	

== See also ==
- Denticity
- Tripodal ligand
