= Tris(2-pyridylmethyl)amine =

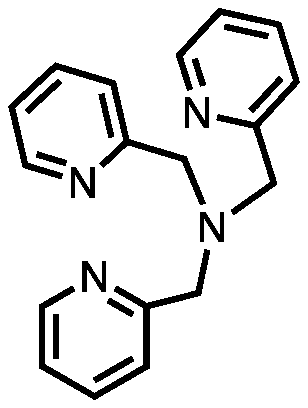

Names
- Preferred IUPAC name 1-(Pyridin-2-yl)-N,N-bis[(pyridin-2-yl)methyl]methanamine
- Other names TPMA, TPA

Identifiers
CAS Number	16858-01-8
3D model (JSmol)	Interactive image
ChemSpider	336061 =
ECHA InfoCard	100.110.193
MeSH	C431843
PubChem CID	379259
UNII	V4CE3X87Z3
CompTox Dashboard (EPA)	DTXSID70327519
- InChI: InChI=1S/C18H18N4/c1-4-10-19-16(7-1)13-22(14-17-8-2-5-11-20-17)15-18-9-3-6-12-21-18/h1-12H,13-15H2 = Key: VGUWFGWZSVLROP-UHFFFAOYSA-N =
- SMILES: c1ccnc(c1)CN(Cc2ccccn2)Cc3ccccn3

Properties
Chemical formula	C_{18}H_{18}N_{4}
Molar mass	290.370 g·mol^{−1}
Appearance	Yellowish-pale brown solid
Melting point	73 to 77 °C (163 to 171 °F; 346 to 350 K)
- Except where otherwise noted, data are given for materials in their standard state (at 25 °C [77 °F], 100 kPa). verify (what is ?) Infobox references

Tris(2-pyridylmethyl)amine (abbreviated TPMA or TPA) is an organic compound with the formula (C_{5}H_{4}NCH_{2})_{3}N. It is a tertiary amine with three picolyl substituents. It is a white solid that is soluble in polar organic solvents. It is a ligand in coordination chemistry.

The ligand is prepared by the alkylation of 2-picolylamine by picolyl chloride:

2 C_{5}H_{4}NCH_{2}Cl + C_{5}H_{4}NCH_{2}NH_{2} → (C_{5}H_{4}NCH_{2})_{3}N + 2 HCl

TPMA is a tripodal ligand, often used to simulate the coordination environment within some proteins. It is also used as a copper ligand in ATRP.

== Related ligands ==
- dipicolylamine, an intermediate in the synthesis of TPMA.
- 2-picolylamine, a bidentate ligand, also known as aminomethylpyridine.
