= Texas Pharmacy Association =

Professional body

The Texas Pharmacy Association was formed as the Texas Pharmaceutical Association (TPA) in the May 1879 in the back of a pharmacy in Dallas, Texas. The name was updated in 1994 to incorporate the idea of pharmacy as a multidisciplinary field that combines a tangible drug product with an intangible cognitive service, which has been developed to be known as Medication Therapy Management. Today the TPA reaches out to almost 4,000 members of pharmacist, technicians, teachers, and others with an investment in pharmacy.

== Purpose ==
The purpose of the Texas Pharmacy Association is to Advocate Pharmacy practice both legally and professionally. This is done through lobbying and Political Action Committees. The TPA also provides Continuing Education to its members, who require 30 hours every two years. Other advocacy functions include development of medication therapy management projects and the Professional Recovery Network.

== Publications ==
The Guide to Texas Pharmacy and Drug Law is made available through TPA.

== Governance ==
TPA is governed by its bylaws. Bylaws allow for an elected board of directors, a board of trustees, and the House of Delegates.

== See also ==
- Texas Pharmacy Association
- Texas Pharmacy Law Book
