= Thermal protective aid =

A thermal protective aid (TPA) is an aluminized polyethylene suit with heat sealed seams that protects from the elements and prevents hypothermia.

It is defined by the International Life-Saving Appliance (LSA) Code as follows:

A thermal protective aid shall be made of a waterproof material having a thermal conductance of not more than 7,800 W/(m^{2}K) and shall be so constructed that, when used to enclose a person, it shall reduce both the convective and evaporative heat loss from the wearer's body.

The thermal protective aid shall:

1. cover the whole body of persons of all sizes wearing a lifejacket with the exception of the face. Hands shall also be covered unless permanently attached gloves are provided; 2. be capable of being unpacked and easily donned without assistance in a survival craft or rescue boat; and 3. permit the wearer to remove it in the water in not more than 2 min, if it impairs ability to swim.

The thermal protective aid shall function properly throughout an air temperature range -30°C to +20°C.

— International Convention for the Safety of Life at Sea (SOLAS)

Every survival craft should have 2 thermal protective aid suits or 10% of its total carrying capacity whichever is greater. For the purpose of high visibility in all weather conditions the suit is coloured in international orange.

Some manufacturers currently construct suits with discrete size bands (XS–XXL) and others of a single ‘universal’ size. Due to its usage conditions it should be suitable to be worn over bulky clothing and lifejacket.

== See also ==
- Immersion suit
- Space blanket
