= Polyhexahydrotriazine =

Polyhexahydrotriazines (PHTs) are polymers of hexahydro-1,3,5-triazines, a class of heterocyclic compounds with the formula (CH_{2}NR)_{3}. They are among the strongest known thermosetting plastics and are stable to solvents at pH > 3, but decompose to the monomers in acidic solutions.

== Synthesis ==
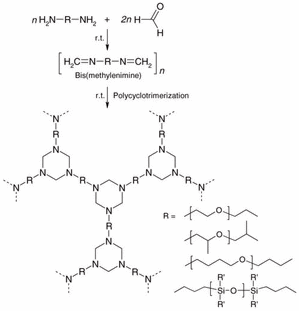
Room-temperature synthesis of polyhexahydrotriazines

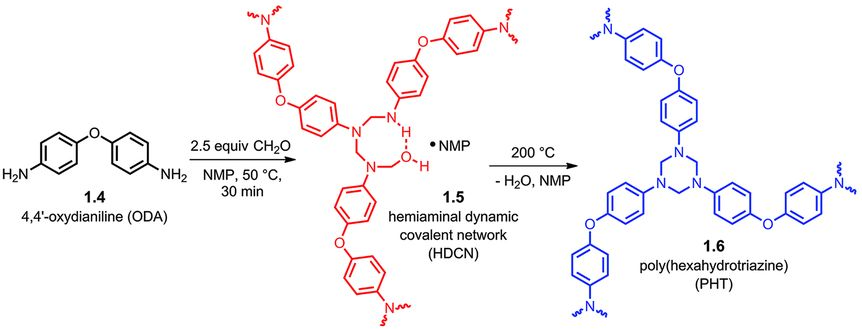
Polycondensation of 4,4'-oxydianiline and paraformaldehyde. At low temperatures, a hemiaminal dynamic covalent network is formed, which is plasticized with ~27% N-methyl pyrrolidone (NMP) and water. Heating to higher temperatures yields a polyhexahydrotriazine.

Various PHTs have been synthesized at room temperature in one step in the early 2000s; they were considered impractical due to their poor mechanical properties. It was later elucidated that, due to the temperature of synthesis, the poor mechanical properties observed were likely due to poly(hemiaminal) formation and not PHT formation.

In 2014, Jeanette Garcia, Gavin Jones and a team of researchers at IBM Almaden Research Center, US, developed a new type of PHT (1.6) in what has been called a "happy accident". Garcia had left out a reagent when preparing her mix of chemicals. When low heat was applied to the beaker of paraformaldehyde and 4,4ʹ-oxydianiline, it had created a hemiaminal dynamic covalent network (HDCN). Heating the HDCN to 200 °C transformed it into two new polymers: PHT 1.6 and an organogel known as polyhemiaminal (PHA)

== Properties ==
The PHT 1.6 has a yellowish color. It is resistant to solvents at pH > 3, but decomposes into monomers within a day in acidic solutions at pH < 2. This property is unusual for thermosetting plastics and allows easy recycling. This PHT has a Young's modulus exceeding 10 GPa, which is among the highest for a thermosetting plastic; it can be further increased by ~50% by dispersing carbon nanotubes in the polymer. The PHT is brittle, and cracks when strained to 1%. Upon heating, it softens at a glass transition temperature of ~190 °C and decomposes at ~300 °C.

== Possible uses ==
A number of industries could benefit from the use of PHT in manufacturing parts and devices due to its recyclability, lightweight structure, and strength:

- Aerospace - PHT used in the development of wings, tails, bodies, and rudders would provide a lightweight, durable vessel for both commercial and personal aircraft applications. PHT in combination with PHA could be used to adhere aircraft pieces that are exposed to harsh environmental conditions and high speeds.
- Automotive - When manufacturing automobiles, PHT would provide a light, high performance option for auto body parts such as panels, hoods, and exterior trim pieces.
- Semiconductors - Semiconductor chips and transistors made of PHT would allow for the reworking of defective electronics rather than having to discard the equipment.
