= 2-Picolylamine =

Names
- Preferred IUPAC name 1-(Pyridin-2-yl)methanamine
- Other names 2-aminomethylpyridine

Identifiers
CAS Number	3731-51-9
3D model (JSmol)	Interactive image
ChEBI	CHEBI:81387
ChEMBL	ChEMBL32189
ChemSpider	18383
ECHA InfoCard	100.020.991
EC Number	223-090-5
KEGG	C17926
PubChem CID	19509
UNII	XK7252M2PA
CompTox Dashboard (EPA)	DTXSID5063152
- InChI: InChI=1S/C6H8N2/c7-5-6-3-1-2-4-8-6/h1-4H,5,7H2 Key: WOXFMYVTSLAQMO-UHFFFAOYSA-N
- SMILES: C1=CC=NC(=C1)CN

Properties
Chemical formula	C_{6}H_{8}N_{2}
Molar mass	108.144 g·mol^{−1}
Density	1.049 g/cm^{3}
Melting point	−20 °C (−4 °F; 253 K)
Boiling point	203 °C (397 °F; 476 K)

Hazards
- GHS labelling
Pictograms	(GHS05: Corrosive) (GHS07: Exclamation mark)
Signal word	Danger
Hazard statements	H314, H319, H335
Precautionary statements	P260, P264, P271, P280, P301+P330+P331, P303+P361+P353, P304+P340, P305+P351+P338, P310, P312, P321, P337+P313, P363, P403+P233, P405, P501
- Except where otherwise noted, data are given for materials in their standard state (at 25 °C [77 °F], 100 kPa). Infobox references

2-Picolylamine is an organic compound with the formula H_{2}NCH_{2}C_{5}H_{4}N. A colorless liquid, it is a common bidentate ligand and a precursor to more complex multidentate ligands such as tris(2-pyridylmethyl)amine. It is usually prepared by hydrogenation of 2-cyanopyridine. One such complex is Baratta's catalyst RuCl_{2}(PPh_{3})_{2}(ampy) (ampy = 2-picolylamine) for transfer hydrogenation. Salts of the complex [Fe(pyCH_{2}NH_{2})_{3}]^{2+} exhibit spin crossover behavior, whereby the complex switches from high to low spin configurations, depending on the temperature.

== Safety ==
The oral LD_{50} in quail is low, being 750 mg/kg.
