= Pyridine-3-carbaldehyde =

Organic compound

Names
- Preferred IUPAC name Pyridine-3-carbaldehyde
- Other names Nicotinaldehyde, 3-formylpyridine, 3-pyridinaldehyde

Identifiers
CAS Number	500-22-1
3D model (JSmol)	Interactive image
ChEBI	CHEBI:28345
ChEMBL	ChEMBL268493
ChemSpider	9943
ECHA InfoCard	100.007.183
EC Number	207-900-4
KEGG	C07327
PubChem CID	10371
UNII	840R4IDQ1T
CompTox Dashboard (EPA)	DTXSID2022044
- InChI: InChI=1S/C6H5NO/c8-5-6-2-1-3-7-4-6/h1-5H Key: QJZUKDFHGGYHMC-UHFFFAOYSA-N
- SMILES: C1=CC(=CN=C1)C=O

Properties
Chemical formula	C_{6}H_{5}NO
Molar mass	107.112 g·mol^{−1}
Appearance	colorless liquid
Density	1.14 g/cm^{3}
Melting point	7 °C (45 °F; 280 K)
Boiling point	95–97 °C (203–207 °F; 368–370 K) 15 mm

Hazards
- GHS labelling
Pictograms	(GHS02: Flammable) (GHS05: Corrosive) (GHS07: Exclamation mark) (GHS08: Health hazard)
Signal word	Danger
Hazard statements	H226, H302, H315, H317, H318, H334, H335, H341, H412
Precautionary statements	P201, P202, P210, P233, P240, P241, P242, P243, P261, P264, P270, P271, P272, P273, P280, P281, P285, P301+P312, P302+P352, P303+P361+P353, P304+P340, P304+P341, P305+P351+P338, P308+P313, P310, P312, P321, P330, P332+P313, P333+P313, P342+P311, P362, P363, P370+P378, P403+P233, P403+P235, P405, P501
- Except where otherwise noted, data are given for materials in their standard state (at 25 °C [77 °F], 100 kPa). Infobox references

Pyridine-3-carbaldehyde, also known as nicotinaldehyde, is an organic compound with the formula C_{5}H_{4}NCHO. It is one of three isomeric pyridinaldehydes. The other isomers are pyridine-2-carboxaldehyde and pyridine-4-carboxaldehyde. It is a colorless liquid that is routinely available commercially. It can be produced from nicotinonitrile. Alternatively, it arises by the aerobic oxidation of the corresponding alcohol.

== Safety ==
3-Pyridinecarboxaldehyde is a severe skin irritant.

== Applications ==
Nicotinaldehyde has known applications for example in the synthesis of Nicothiazone, JWB1-84-1, Milameline, RP-48740, IP-66, SJ-733 & Doxpicomine.
