= Pyridine-4-carbaldehyde =

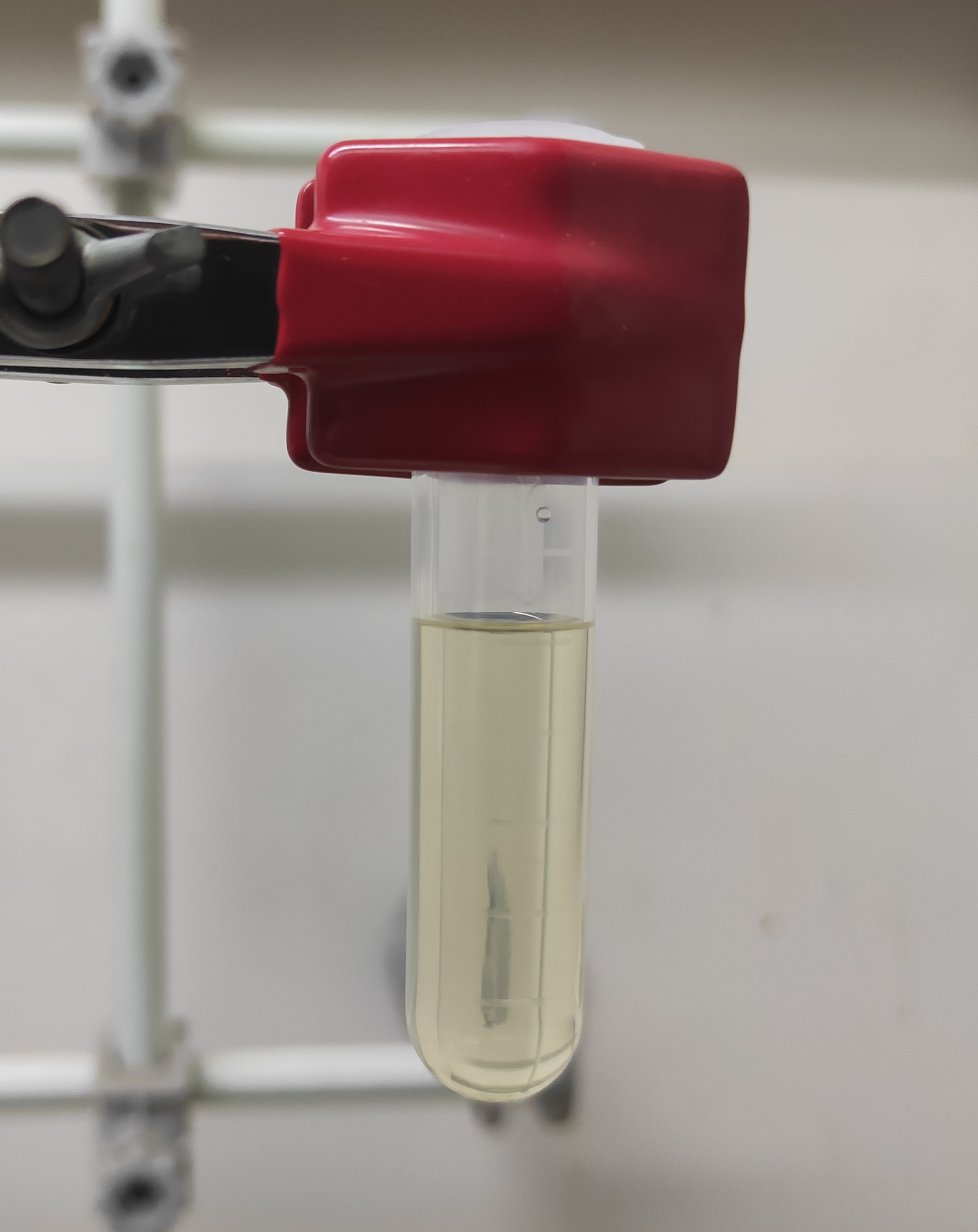

Names
- Preferred IUPAC name Pyridine-4-carbaldehyde
- Other names 4-formylpyridine, 4-pyridinaldehyde, isonicotinaldehyde

Identifiers
CAS Number	872-85-5
3D model (JSmol)	Interactive image
ChEMBL	ChEMBL2251606
ChemSpider	12816
ECHA InfoCard	100.011.666
EC Number	212-832-3
PubChem CID	13389
UNII	P577557492
CompTox Dashboard (EPA)	DTXSID1061237
- InChI: InChI=1S/C6H5NO/c8-5-6-1-3-7-4-2-6/h1-5H Key: BGUWFUQJCDRPTL-UHFFFAOYSA-N
- SMILES: C1=CN=CC=C1C=O

Properties
Chemical formula	C_{6}H_{5}NO
Molar mass	107.112 g·mol^{−1}
Appearance	colorless liquid
Melting point	4 °C (39 °F; 277 K)
Boiling point	198 °C (388 °F; 471 K)
Acidity (pK_{a})	4.72

Hazards
- GHS labelling
Pictograms	(GHS07: Exclamation mark)
Signal word	Warning
Hazard statements	H315, H317, H319, H335
Precautionary statements	P261, P264, P271, P272, P280, P302+P352, P304+P340, P305+P351+P338, P312, P321, P332+P313, P333+P313, P337+P313, P362, P363, P403+P233, P405, P501
- Except where otherwise noted, data are given for materials in their standard state (at 25 °C [77 °F], 100 kPa). Infobox references

Pyridine-4-carbaldehyde is an organic compound with the formula C_{5}H_{4}NCHO. It is one of three isomeric pyridinaldehydes. The other isomers are pyridine-2-carboxaldehyde and pyridine-3-carboxaldehyde. Pyridine-4-carboxaldehyde is a colorless liquid, although aged samples can appear yellow or even brown. It undergoes many reactions expected for aromatic aldehydes such as reductive amination and Schiff base formation. It condenses with pyrrole to give tetrapyridylporphyrin. The pKa has been experimentally determined by NMR spectroscopy to be 4.72.
