= Methylene imine =

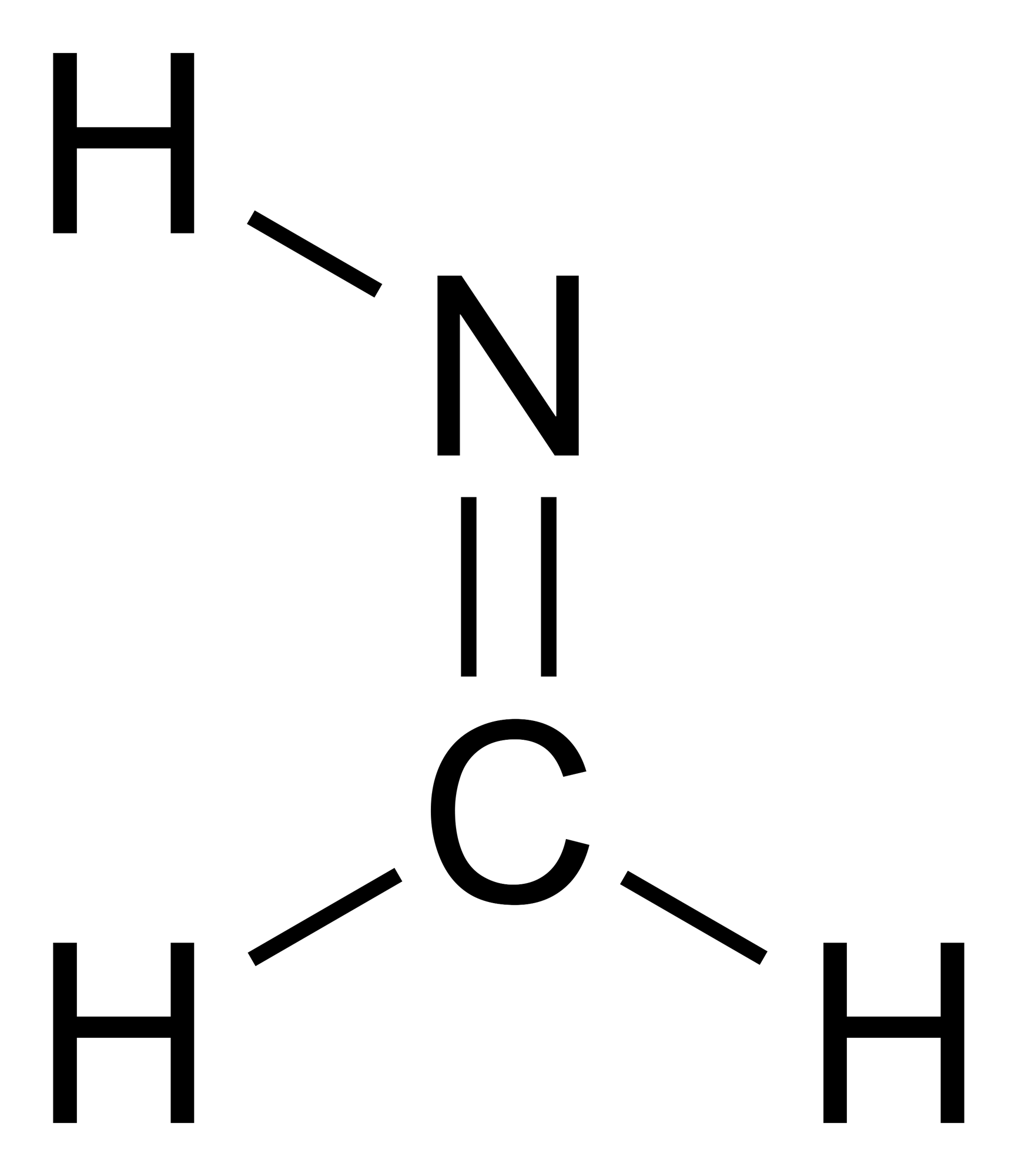

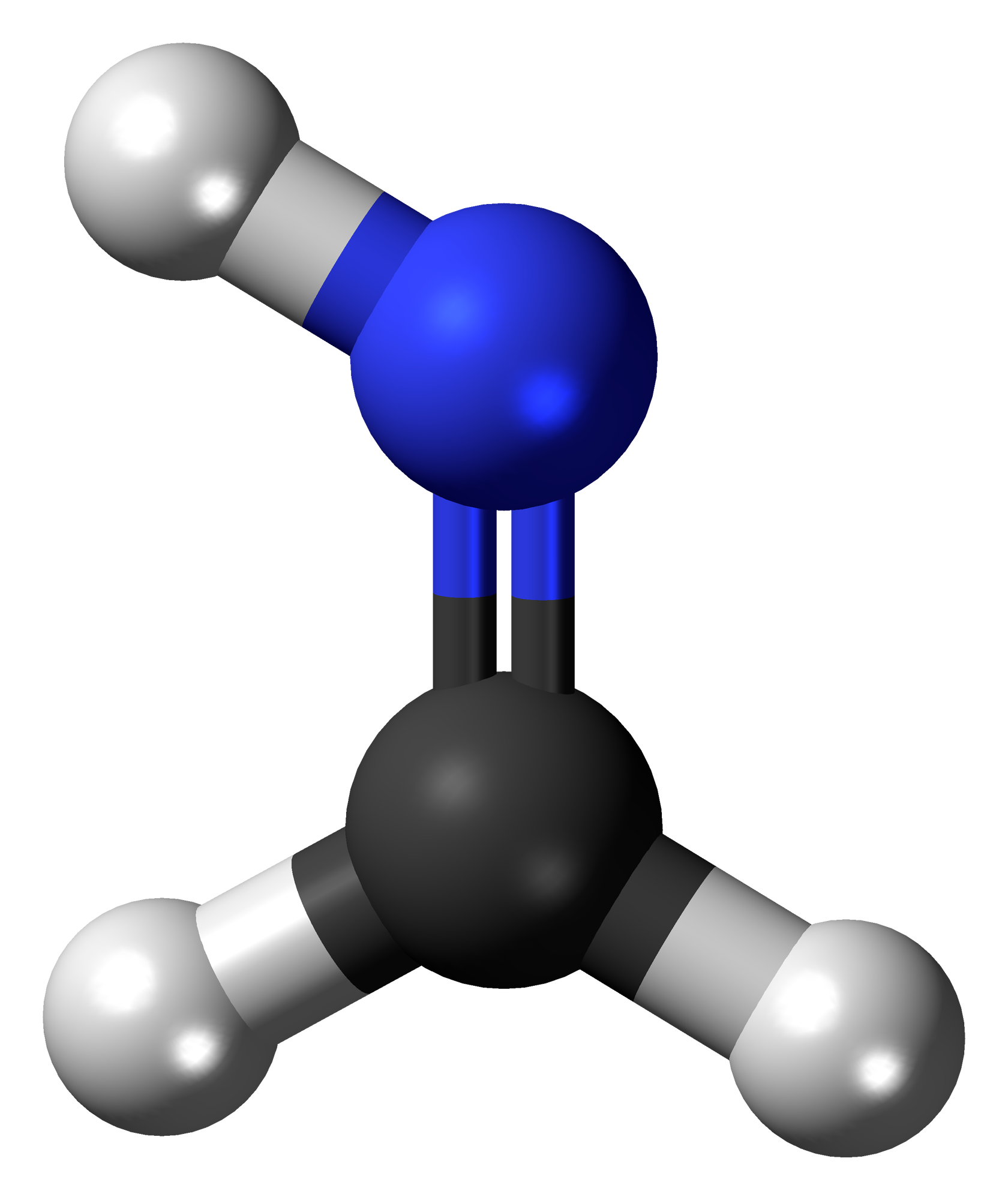

Names
- Preferred IUPAC name Methanimine
- Other names: Formaldimine; Azomethine; Formaldehyde imine

Identifiers
CAS Number	2053-29-4
3D model (JSmol)	Interactive image
Beilstein Reference	1900196
ChEBI	CHEBI:38220
ChemSpider	109754
Gmelin Reference	163896
PubChem CID	123139
CompTox Dashboard (EPA)	DTXSID10174524
- InChI: InChI=1S/CH3N/c1-2/h2H,1H2 Key: WDWDWGRYHDPSDS-UHFFFAOYSA-N
- SMILES: C=N

Properties
Chemical formula	CH_{3}N
Molar mass	29.042 g·mol^{−1}
Appearance	colorless gas

Related compounds
Related compounds	N-Methylmethanimine; Ethanimine; Formaldoxime; Formaldehyde; Ethylene; Imine
- Except where otherwise noted, data are given for materials in their standard state (at 25 °C [77 °F], 100 kPa). Infobox references

Methylene imine is an organic compound with the chemical formula H_{2}C=NH. The simplest imine, it is a stable, colorless gas that has been detected throughout the universe. Structural parameters determined by microwave spectroscopy include a C=N bond length of 1.27 Å, an N–H bond length of 1.02 Å and an H−N=C bond angle of 110.5°. Because unhindered imines polymerize or oligomerize when concentrated, methylene imine has not been isolated as a liquid or bulk solid. Attempted synthesis of methylene imine from the reaction of ammonia and formaldehyde produces hexamethylenetetramine.
