= Tripodal ligand =

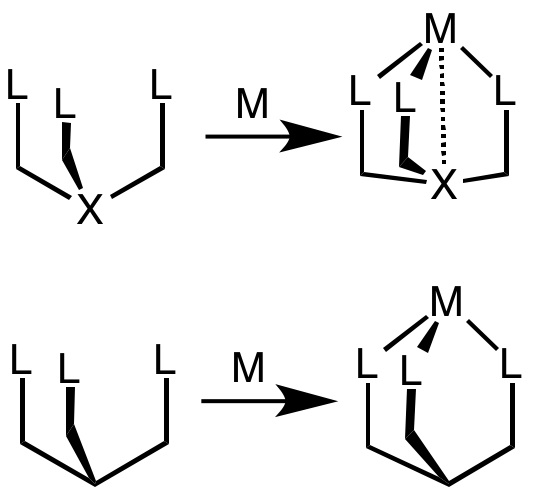
Motifs for complexation of tri- and tetradentate tripodal ligands

Tripodal ligands are tridentate and tetradentate ligands. They are popular in research in the areas of coordination chemistry and homogeneous catalysis. Because the ligands are polydentate, they do not readily dissociate from the metal centre. Many tripodal ligands have C_{3} symmetry.

== Coordination chemistry ==
In their coordination complexes with an octahedral molecular geometry the tridentate tripod ligands occupy one face, leading to a fixed facial (or fac) geometry. The tetradentate tripodal ligands occupy four contiguous sites, leaving two cis positions available on the octahedral metal center. When bound to four- and five-coordinate metal centres, these ligands impose C_{3} symmetry, which can lead to uncommon ligand field splitting patterns. Tripodal ligands are often able to coordinately saturate metal ions with lower coordination numbers.

One tripodal ligand of commercial significance is nitrilotriacetate, N(CH_{2}COO^{−})_{3} because it is cheaply produced and has a high affinity for divalent metal ions. Other tripodal triamine ligands include tren (N(CH_{2}CH_{2}NH_{2})_{3}) and cis-1,3,5-triaminocyclohexane. Certain triphosphines such as RC(CH_{2}PPh_{2})_{3} are also tripodal. Many kinds of donor groups have been incorporated into the arms of tripodal ligands, including amido (R_{2}N^{−}), and N-heterocyclic carbenes.

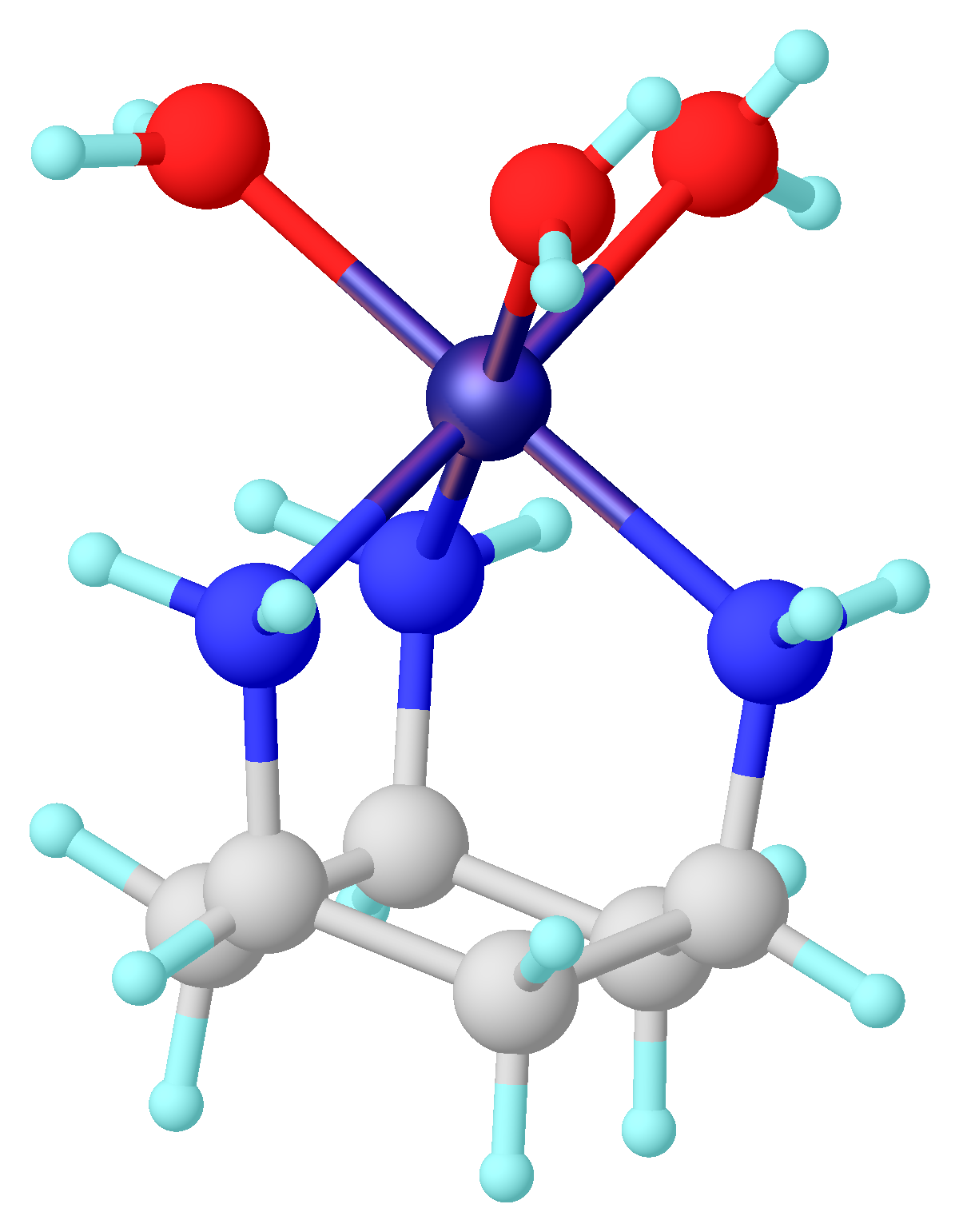
Structure of [Ni(TACH)(H_{2}O)_{3}]^{2+} (color code: blue = nitrogen, red = oxygen, dark blue = nickel).

Tripodal ligand examples

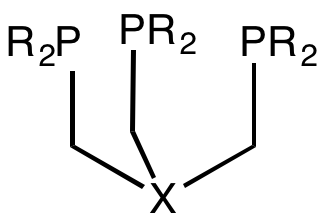
A tripodal triphosphines, X can be CR, SiR, Si^{−}, BR^{−}, B, N, P etc.

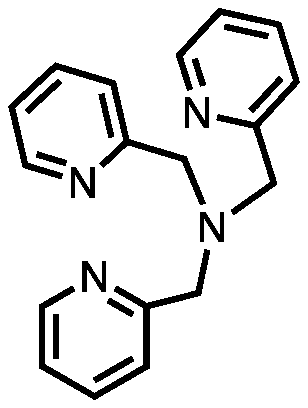
Tris(2-pyridylmethyl)amine, a tetradentate tripodal ligand popular in bioinorganic chemistry.

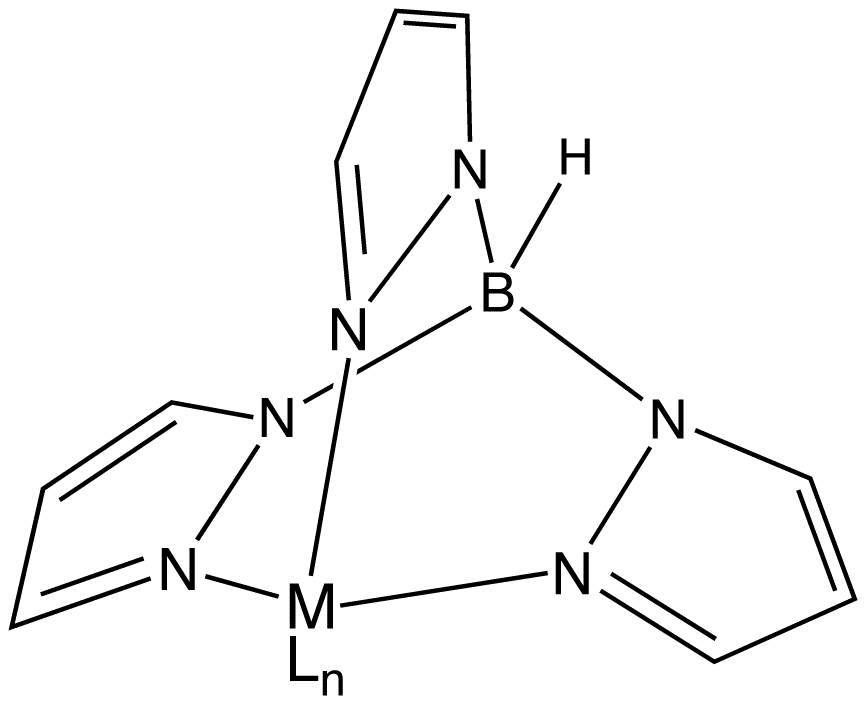
Structure of a metal complex of trispyrazolylborate, an anionic tridentate tripod ligand.

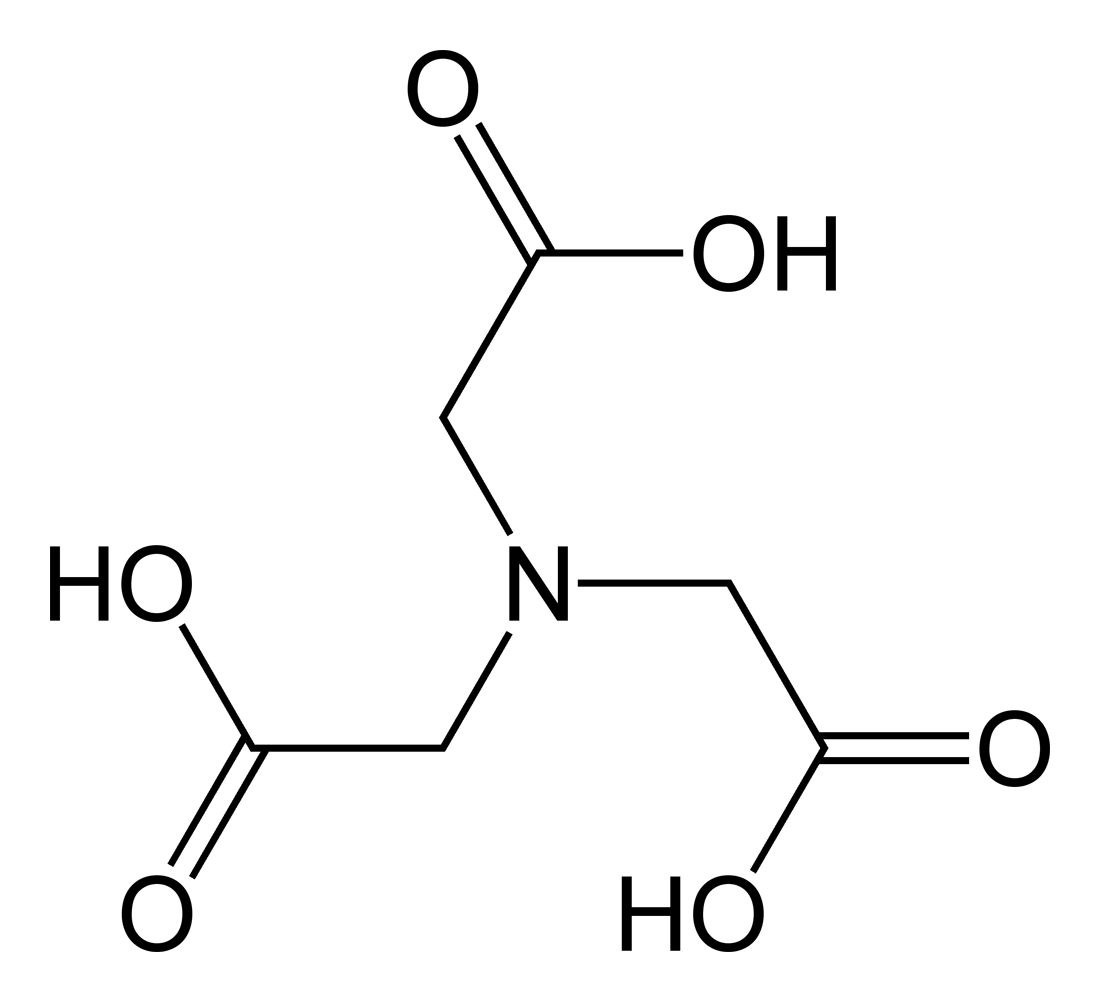
NTA is a commercially important tripodal ligand. Its three carboxylic acid groups undergo deprotonation upon complexation.

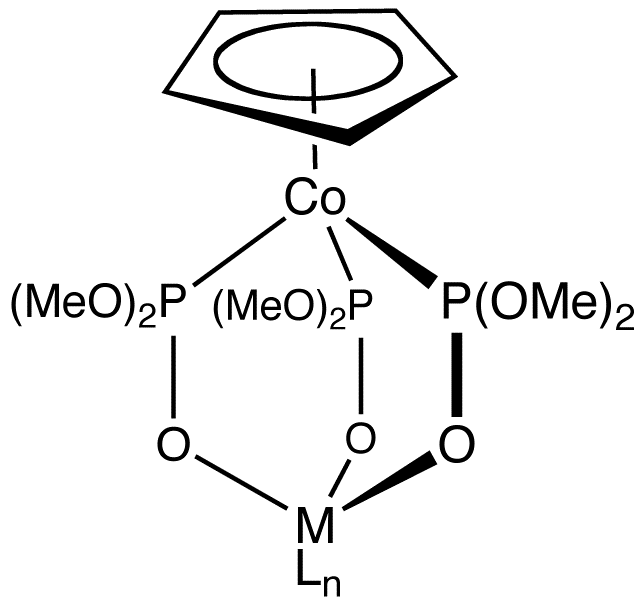
The Kläui ligand, a dianionic organometallic ligand.

1,1,1-Tris(aminomethyl)ethane

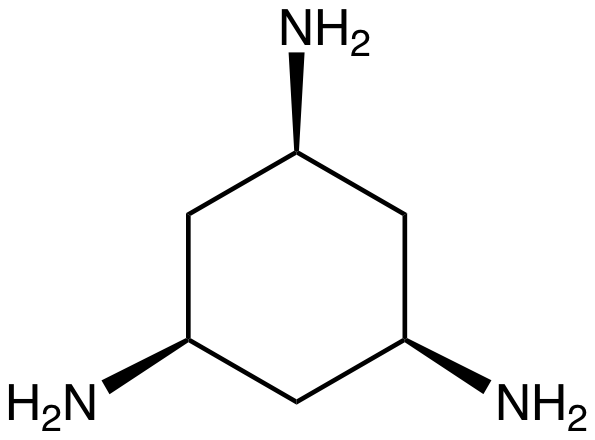
cis,cis-1,3,5-triaminocyclohexane

citric acid, when triply deprotonated, is an unsymmetrical tripodal ligand.
