= 1,3,5-Trimethyl-1,3,5-triazinane =

Names
- Preferred IUPAC name 1,3,5-Trimethyl-1,3,5-triazinane
- Other names: Hexahydro-1,3,5-trimethyl-s-triazine; Hexahydro-1,3,5-trimethyl-1,3,5-triazine; 1,3,5-Trimethyl-1,3,5-triazacyclohexane; 1,3,5-Trimethylhexahydro-1,3,5-triazine

Identifiers
CAS Number	108-74-7
3D model (JSmol)	Interactive image
ChemSpider	7664
ECHA InfoCard	100.003.285
EC Number	203-612-8
PubChem CID	7952
UNII	91CT72PELC
CompTox Dashboard (EPA)	DTXSID6051560
- InChI: InChI=1S/C6H15N3/c1-7-4-8(2)6-9(3)5-7/h4-6H2,1-3H3 Key: DPMZXMBOYHBELT-UHFFFAOYSA-N
- SMILES: CN1CN(C)CN(C)C1

Properties
Chemical formula	C_{6}H_{15}N_{3}
Molar mass	129.207 g·mol^{−1}
Appearance	Colorless or white liquid
Density	0.925 g/cm^{3}
Melting point	−27 °C (−17 °F; 246 K)
Boiling point	155–160 °C (311–320 °F; 428–433 K)

Hazards
- GHS labelling
Pictograms	(GHS02: Flammable) (GHS05: Corrosive) (GHS07: Exclamation mark) (GHS08: Health hazard)
Signal word	Danger
Hazard statements	H226, H302, H314, H317, H335, H373, H412
Precautionary statements	P210, P233, P240, P241, P242, P243, P260, P264, P264+P265, P270, P271, P272, P273, P280, P301+P317, P301+P330+P331, P302+P352, P302+P361+P354, P303+P361+P353, P304+P340, P305+P354+P338, P316, P317, P319, P321, P330, P333+P317, P362+P364, P363, P370+P378, P403+P233, P403+P235, P405, P501
- Except where otherwise noted, data are given for materials in their standard state (at 25 °C [77 °F], 100 kPa). Infobox references

1,3,5-Trimethyl-1,3,5-triazinane is an organic compound with the formula (CH_{3}NCH_{2})_{3}. It is a colorless liquid that is soluble in many organic solvents. Structurally, it is one of several related hexahydro-1,3,5-triazines, which typically result from the condensation reaction of amines and formaldehyde.

It undergoes deprotonation by butyllithium to give a reagent that serves as a source of the formyl anion.
