= 1,1,1-Tris(aminomethyl)ethane =

Names
- Preferred IUPAC name 2-(Aminomethyl)-2-methylpropane-1,3-diamine
- Other names TAME

Identifiers
CAS Number	15995-42-3
3D model (JSmol)	Interactive image
ChemSpider	3721461
ECHA InfoCard	100.149.897
PubChem CID	4526530
CompTox Dashboard (EPA)	DTXSID60403952
- InChI: InChI=1S/C5H15N3/c1-5(2-6,3-7)4-8/h2-4,6-8H2,1H3 Key: UGDSCHVVUPHIFM-UHFFFAOYSA-N; InChI=1/C5H15N3/c1-5(2-6,3-7)4-8/h2-4,6-8H2,1H3 Key: UGDSCHVVUPHIFM-UHFFFAOYAE
- SMILES: CC(CN)(CN)CN

Properties
Chemical formula	CH_{3}C(CH_{2}NH_{2})_{3}
Molar mass	117.20
Appearance	Colorless liquid
Density	1.0 g/cm^{3}
Boiling point	264.0 °C (507.2 °F; 537.1 K)

Hazards
Flash point	128.6 °C (263.5 °F; 401.8 K)
- Except where otherwise noted, data are given for materials in their standard state (at 25 °C [77 °F], 100 kPa). Infobox references

1,1,1-Tris(aminomethyl)ethane (TAME) is an organic compound with the formula CH_{3}C(CH_{2}NH_{2})_{3}. It is a colorless liquid. It is classified as a polyamine tripodal ligand, i.e., capable of binding to metal ions through three sites and hence is a tridentate chelating ligand, occupying a face of the coordination polyhedron.

== Preparation ==
TAME is synthesized by the Pd/C-catalyzed hydrogenation of 1,1,1-tris(azidomethyl)ethane. Although azides are potentially explosive, they are excellent and practical source of primary amines. The required tris(azidomethyl)ethane is obtained from the tritosylate by salt metathesis using sodium azide. These two steps are:

3 NaN_{3} + CH_{3}C(CH_{2}OTs)_{3} → CH_{3}C(CH_{2}N_{3})_{3} + 3 NaOTs
3 H_{2} + CH_{3}C(CH_{2}N_{3})_{3} → CH_{3}C(CH_{2}NH_{2})_{3} + 3 N_{2}

== Complexes of TAME ==
The tripodal TAME ligand coordinates facially to metal ions. This stereochemical feature has been exploited in the preparation of platinum(IV) cage complexes, e.g., [Pt(tame)_{2}]^{4+}, which is a six coordinate Pt(IV) complex. Platinum in its +4 oxidation state has a d_{6} configuration and is kinetically inert. For this reason the formation of [Pt(tame)_{2}]^{4+} is initiated by installing TAME on a platinum(II) precursor. The resulting square planar complex is oxidized with [PtCl_{6}]^{2−} to produce the target Pt(IV) derivatives.
