= Pyridine-2-carbaldehyde =

- Picolinaldehyde

Names
- Preferred IUPAC name Pyridine-2-carbaldehyde
- Other names Picolinaldehyde; 2-Pyridine carboxaldehyde 2-Pyridyl aldehyde Picolinal

Identifiers
CAS Number	1121-60-4
3D model (JSmol)	Interactive image
ChEMBL	ChEMBL274794
ChemSpider	13635
ECHA InfoCard	100.013.031
PubChem CID	14273
UNII	KH86K8FHZ2
CompTox Dashboard (EPA)	DTXSID1061522
- InChI: InChI=1S/C6H5NO/c8-5-6-3-1-2-4-7-6/h1-5H Key: CSDSSGBPEUDDEE-UHFFFAOYSA-N
- SMILES: O=Cc1ncccc1

Properties
Chemical formula	C_{6}H_{5}NO
Molar mass	107.112 g·mol^{−1}
Density	1.126 g/mL
Melting point	148–151 °C (298–304 °F; 421–424 K)
Boiling point	181 °C (358 °F; 454 K)

Related compounds
Related Aldehydes	Salicylaldehyde; Quinoline Carboxaldehyde
Related compounds	Picolinic acid
- Except where otherwise noted, data are given for materials in their standard state (at 25 °C [77 °F], 100 kPa). Infobox references

Pyridine-2-carbaldehyde, also called 2-formylpyridine, is an organic compound with the formula NC_{5}H_{4}CHO. It is one of three isomeric pyridinaldehydes. The other isomers are pyridine-3-carboxaldehyde and pyridine-4-carboxaldehyde.

Pyridine-2-carbaldehyde is a colorless oily liquid with a distinctive odor. Older samples are often brown-colored owing to impurities. It serves as a precursor to other compounds of interest in coordination chemistry and pharmaceuticals. Pyridine aldehydes are typically prepared by oxidation of the hydroxymethyl- or methylpyridines.

== Reactions and uses ==
The drug pralidoxime can be produced from 2-formylpyridine.

The aldehyde functional group is subject to nucleophilic attack, specifically by amines to form Schiff bases, which serve as bidentate ligands. Iminopyridine complexes can be remarkably robust.

Pyridine-2-carbaldehyde is used in the synthesis of ARN2966 [102212-26-0], one of the syntheses of Mefloquine, RWJ-22757 (Mcn-5195) [103729-18-6], & in one of the syntheses of Carbinoxamine.
