= Acetaldehyde ammonia trimer =

Names
- Preferred IUPAC name 2,4,6-Trimethyl-1,3,5-triazinane

Identifiers
CAS Number	58052-80-5; 638-14-2
3D model (JSmol)	Interactive image
ChemSpider	62692
ECHA InfoCard	100.201.766
EC Number	211-321-2
PubChem CID	69486
CompTox Dashboard (EPA)	DTXSID30980366
- InChI: InChI=1S/C6H15N3/c1-4-7-5(2)9-6(3)8-4/h4-9H,1-3H3 Key: MZSSRMMSFLVKPK-UHFFFAOYSA-N; InChI=1/C6H15N3/c1-4-7-5(2)9-6(3)8-4/h4-9H,1-3H3 Key: MZSSRMMSFLVKPK-UHFFFAOYAJ
- SMILES: N1C(NC(NC1C)C)C

Properties
Chemical formula	C_{6}H_{15}N_{3}
Molar mass	129.207 g·mol^{−1}
Appearance	Colorless crystals
Melting point	95 to 97 °C (203 to 207 °F; 368 to 370 K)
Solubility	polar organic solvents

Hazards
- GHS labelling
Pictograms	(GHS07: Exclamation mark)
Hazard statements	H315, H319, H335
Precautionary statements	P261, P304+P340, P305+P351+P338, P312, P321, P332+P313, P337+P313, P362, P403+P233, P405
- Except where otherwise noted, data are given for materials in their standard state (at 25 °C [77 °F], 100 kPa). verify (what is ?) Infobox references

Acetaldehyde ammonia trimer is a chemical compound described by the formula (CH_{3}CHNH)_{3}. The pure material is colourless but samples often appear light yellow or slightly beige due to the degradation by oxidation. It is hygroscopic, and can be found in a trihydrate form.

As implied by its name, it is a trimeric species formed from the reaction of acetaldehyde and ammonia:

3 CH_{3}CHO + 3 NH_{3} → (CH_{3}CHNH)_{3} + 3 H_{2}O

Studies using NMR spectroscopy indicate that the three methyl groups are equatorial, thus the molecule has C_{3v} point group symmetry.

The compound is related to hexamethylenetetramine, which is the condensation product of ammonia and formaldehyde.
