= Cis,cis-1,3,5-Triaminocyclohexane =

cis,cis-1,3,5-Triaminocyclohexane

Names
- Preferred IUPAC name (1s,3s,5s)-Cyclohexane-1,3,5-triamine
- Other names TACH; cis,cis-Cyclohexane-1,3,5-triamine

Identifiers
CAS Number	26150-46-9
3D model (JSmol)	Interactive image
ChemSpider	19549297
PubChem CID	427712
UNII	WS7W6V8246
- InChI: InChI=1S/C6H15N3/c7-4-1-5(8)3-6(9)2-4/h4-6H,1-3,7-9H2/t4-,5+,6- Key: UYAUGHKQCCCFDK-FPFOFBBKSA-N
- SMILES: C1[C@@H](C[C@@H](C[C@@H]1N)N)N

Properties
Chemical formula	C_{6}H_{15}N_{3}
Molar mass	129.207 g·mol^{−1}
Appearance	Colorless liquid
Boiling point	285 °C (545 °F; 558 K)
- Except where otherwise noted, data are given for materials in their standard state (at 25 °C [77 °F], 100 kPa). Infobox references

cis,cis-1,3,5-Triaminocyclohexane is an organic compound with the formula (CH_{2}CHNH_{2})_{3}. It is a triamine. Of the many isomers possible for triaminocyclohexane, the cis,cis-1,3,5-derivative has attracted attention because it is a common tripodal ligand, abbreviated as tach. It is a colorless oil. It is a popular tridentate ligand in coordination chemistry.

It is prepared from the triscarbamate of cyclohexane. The latter is generated via the Curtius rearrangement starting from cyclohexanetricarboxylic acid.

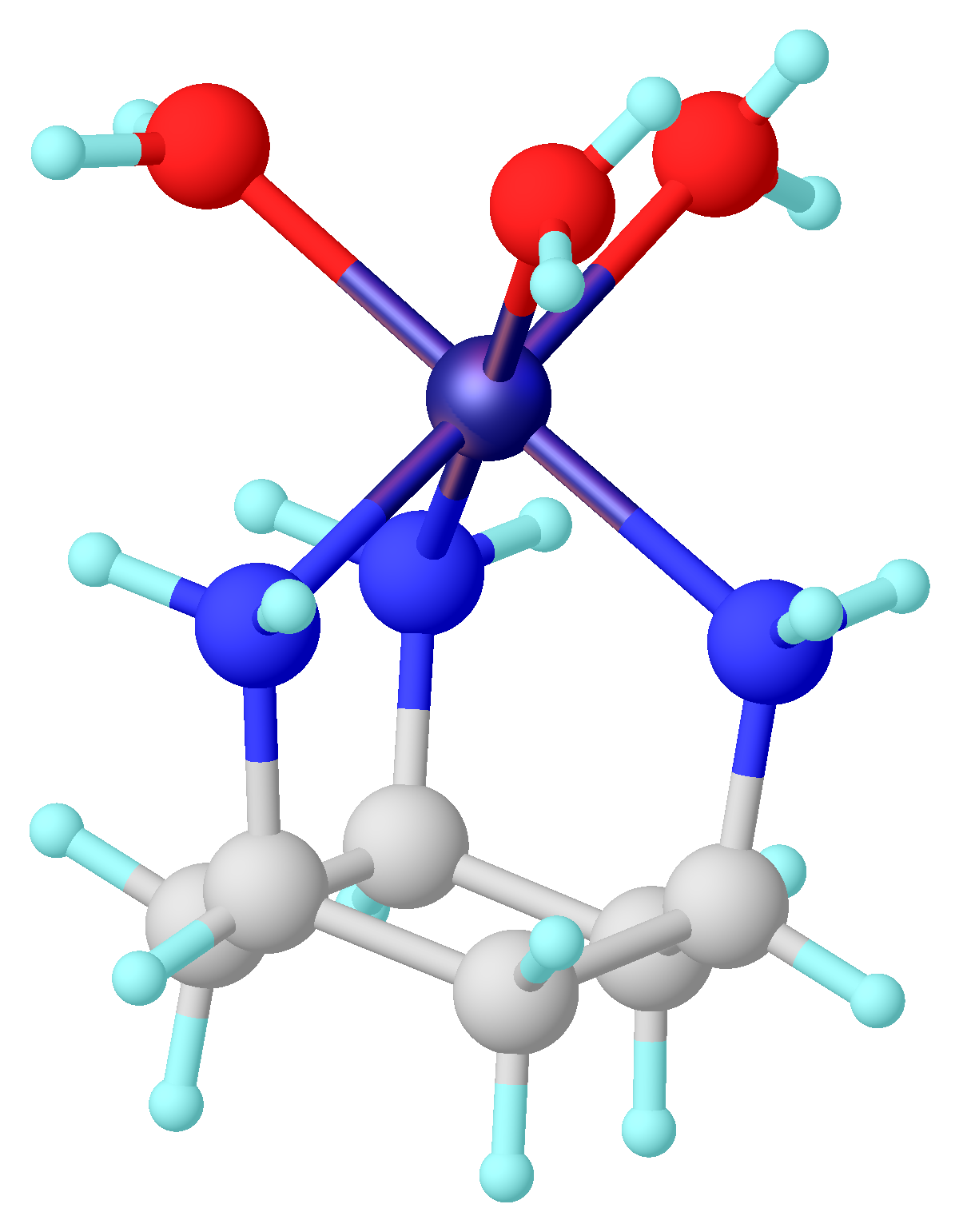
Structure of [Ni(TACH)(H_{2}O)_{3}]^{2+} (color code: blue = nitrogen, red = oxygen; dark blue = nickel).

== Related ligands ==
- Tris(aminomethyl)ethane, another tripodal triamine (CH_{3}C(CH_{2}NH_{2}]_{3})
