= Germanium(II) dicationic complexes =

Ge(II) dicationic complexes refer to coordination compounds of germanium with a +2 formal oxidation state, and a +2 charge on the overall complex. In some of these coordination complexes, the coordination is strongly ionic, localizing a +2 charge on Ge, while in others the bonding is more covalent, delocalizing the cationic charge away from Ge. Examples of dicationic Ge(II) complexes are much rarer than monocationic Ge(II) complexes, often requiring the use of bulky ligands to shield the germanium center. Dicationic complexes of Ge(II) have been isolated with bulky isocyanide and carbene ligands. Much more weakly coordinated Germanium (II) dications have been isolated as complexes with polyether ligands, such as crown ethers and [2.2.2]cryptand. Crown ethers and cryptands are typically known for their ability to bind metal cations, however these ligands have also been employed in stabilizing low-valent cations of heavier p-block elements. A Ge^{2+} ion's valence shell consists of a filled valence s orbital but empty valence p orbitals, giving rise to atypical bonding in these complexes. Germanium is a metalloid of the carbon group, typically forming compounds with mainly covalent bonding, contrasting with the dative bonding observed in these coordination complexes.

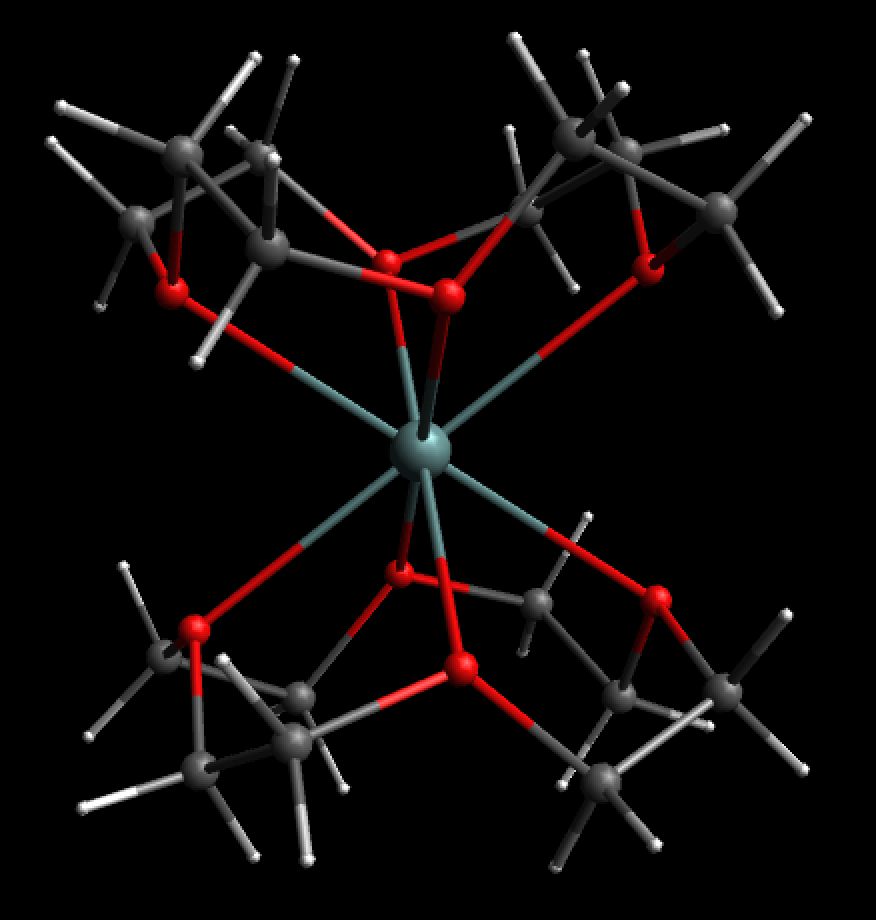
Structure of a Ge^{2+} complex with [12]crown-4, from X-ray crystal structure

== History ==
In 2007, a Ge(II) based dication was reported by Rupar, Staroverov, Ragogna and Baines in which a Ge(II) unit is coordinated by three bulky N-heterocyclic carbene ligands. Later in 2008, Rupar, Staroverov and Baines isolated a weakly coordinate Ge(II) dication using cryptand[2.2.2], also the first example of a non-metallic mononuclear dication complexed with a cryptand. In this report, a Ge(II) cation is encapsulated within [2.2.2]cryptand with two triflate counter ions. The crystal structure of this Ge cryptand[2.2.2] (CF_{3}SO_{3})_{2} salt reveals a lack of coordination between the encapsulated Ge(II) cation and the triflate anions. Since these reports, similar cationic Ge(II) complexes have been prepared employing crown ethers, azamacrocycles, and bulky isocyanide ligands.

== Synthesis ==
In the preparation of Ge(II) cationic complexes, triflate is often chosen as a counter anion as it is relatively weakly coordinating. GeCl_{2}•dioxane is often used as a starting material, as it is a convenient source of Ge(II).

=== Ge(II) cryptand[2.2.2] ===
The Ge(II) cryptand[2.2.2] complex was prepared by the addition of cryptand to a solution of N-heterocyclic carbene stabilized GeCl(CF_{3}SO_{3}) in tetrahydrofuran. The products obtained from this reaction are summarized below. The germanium cryptand salt precipitated from solution as a white powder, and the identity was established using proton NMR and crystal X-ray diffraction. The carbene stabilized germanium chloride side products (structures given below) were identified in solution after the reaction.

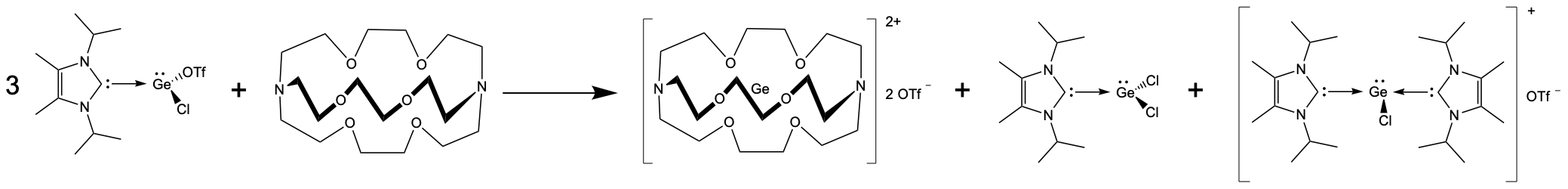
Ge(II) cryptand synthesis reported in Rupar, P. A.; Staroverov, V. N.; Baines, K. M. Science 2008, 322, 1360–1363.

=== Ge(II) crown ethers ===
Ge(II) cationic species have been isolated with several crown ether ligands, including [12]crown-4, [15]crown-5, and [18]crown-6. Rupar et al. reported the synthesis of various germanium crown ethers employing GeCl_{2}•dioxane as the source of Ge(II). Trimethylsilyl trifluoromethanesulfonate (Me_{3}SiOTf) was used to displace chloride ligands with a more weakly associating triflate ligand. The resulting germanium crown ether complexes can adopt different geometries and cation charges depending on the size of the crown ether and the nature of the anionic ligand, summarized in the figure below. Only the Ge complex with [12]crown-4 is able to fully exclude counter anions from coordinating to Ge to give a dicationic complex. The larger crown ethers do not form sandwich complexes with Ge, and leave room for an anion to associate with the encapsulated Ge. These complexes were characterized with NMR, X-ray crystallography, Raman spectroscopy, and mass spectrometry.

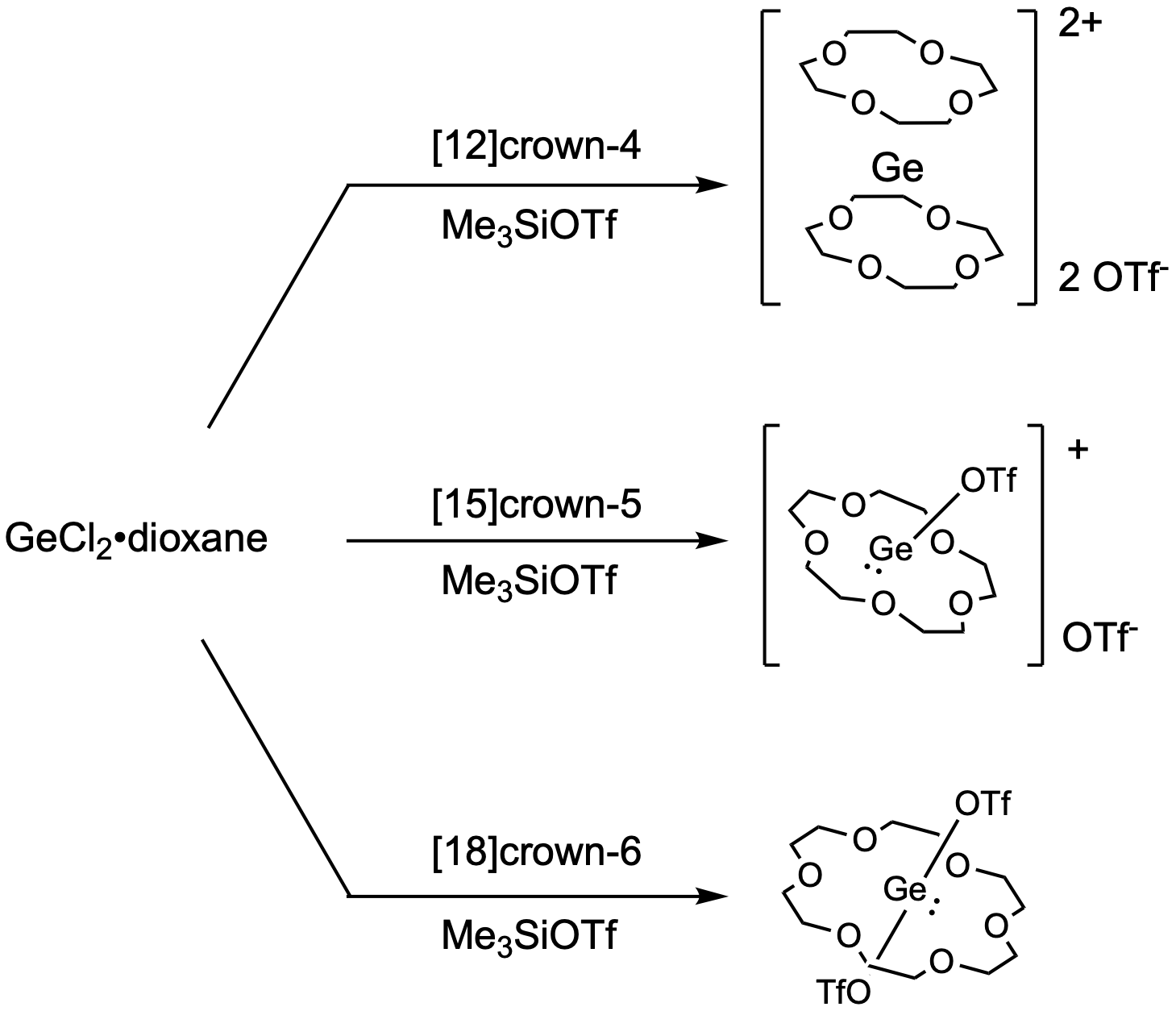
The preparation of various Ge(II) crown ether complexes

=== Ge(II) carbene complex ===
The Ge(II) carbene stabilized dication reported by Rupar et al. was prepared by treating GeCl_{2}•dioxane with an N-heterocyclic carbene (1,3-diisopropyl-4,5-dimethylimidazol-2-ylidene) to give the GeCl_{2} carbene complex. Upon treatment with trimethylsilyl iodide and excess carbene, the dicationic complex consisting of three carbene ligands to one Ge atom was formed.

=== Ge(II) 2,6-dimethylphenyl isocyanide complex ===
A Ge(II) dication stabilized by 4 isocyanide ligands was prepared by mixing GeCl_{2}•dioxane and 2,6-dimethylphenyl isocyanide in toluene (scheme given below). Three molecules of GeCl_{2} are required per four molecules of the isocyanide ligand, as the counter anion is GeCl_{3}^{−}. This complex was crystallized from toluene, and was characterized by X-ray crystallography and NMR spectroscopy.

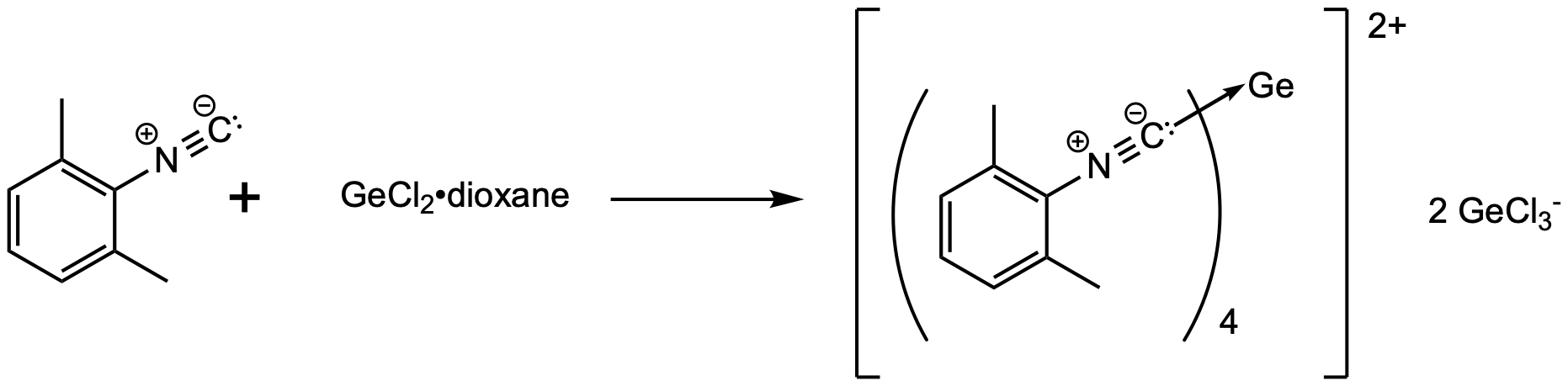
Preparation of the Ge(II) 2,6-dimethylphenyl isocyanide complex

== Structure and bonding ==
The geometry of these Ge(II) complexes is not adequately described by VSEPR theory due to the nature of the lone pair on Ge(II). VSEPR theory is used to predict geometric distortions about atoms with nonbonding electrons (lone pairs), but in some cases heavier main group elements can violate VSEPR theory, displaying a stereochemically inactive or "spherically symmetric" lone pair, deemed the inert-pair effect. Ge(II) complexes can possess stereochemically active or inactive lone pairs, depending on the ligand. To further assess the nature of the electronic structure of Ge(II) dicationic complexes, natural bond orbital (NBO) computational analysis is often employed.

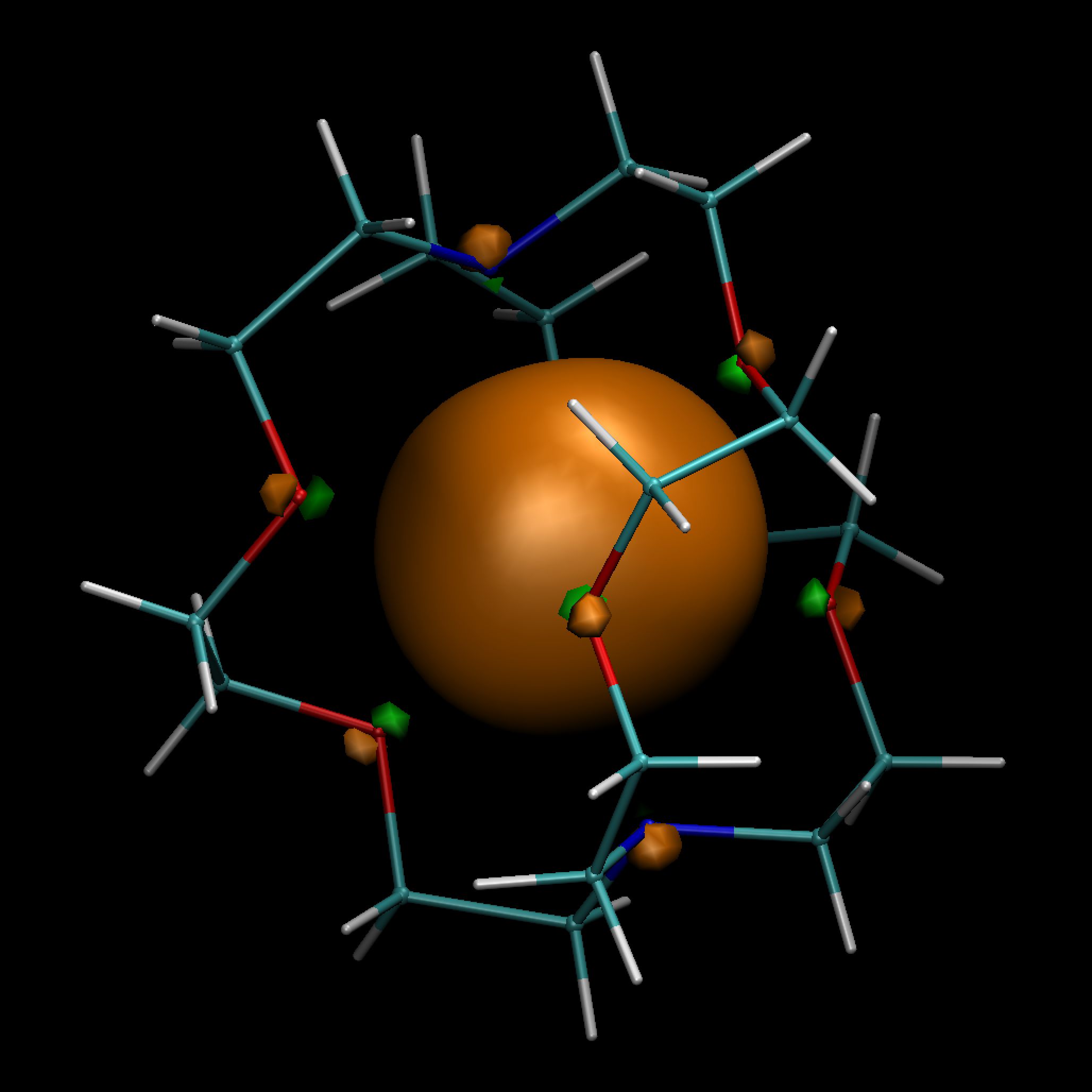
Visualization of the Ge(II) lone pair in cryptand[2.2.2], based on NBO analysis

=== Cryptand and crown ethers ===
The bonding in such Ge(II) polyether complexes is believed to be mainly ionic in character, differing from the expected mainly covalent character typical of most germanium compounds. This lack of a covalent interaction is exemplified in the relatively long Ge-O distances observed in crystal structures of Ge crown ether and Ge cryptand complexes. Ge-O covalent single bonds are expected to be approximately 1.8 Å in length. The crystal structure of the Ge(II) cryptand[2.2.2] complex reveals a much longer Ge-O distance of 2.49 Å, similarly the Ge-O distances range from 2.38-2.49 Å in the Ge(II) ([12]crown-4)_{2} sandwich complex. For the Ge(II) cryptand[2.2.2] complex, NBO analysis reveals the Ge(II) cation does not participate in any covalent bonding and that the lone pair on the Ge(II) resides in a purely s orbital, indicating a stereochemically inactive lone pair. This lone pair orbital of Ge(II) within cryptand[2.2.2] is depicted to the right. In the Ge(II) crown ether complexes presented above, only the sandwich complex with [12]crown-4 clearly bears a stereochemically inactive lone pair, suggested by the high symmetry of the complex. The Ge(II) complexes with [15]crown-5, and [18]crown-6 show geometric distortions likely due to the activity of the Ge(II) lone pair.

=== Carbenes and isocyanides ===
The bonding in Ge(II) dications stabilized by carbenes and isocyanides is believed to be more covalent in nature compared with the bonding in the polyether complexes. Furthermore, the positive charge in these complexes can be quite delocalized.

In the Ge(II) carbene dication complex reported by Rupar et al., the Ge-C bonds are 2.07 Å in length, only marginally longer than expected Ge-C bond lengths. This suggests that the Ge-carbene interaction is not dative, but more covalent in nature. Limiting resonance forms for the Ge(II) carbene dication can be drawn (shown below), with the Ge(II) bearing the full +2 charge, or with the carbenes forming covalent bonds to the Ge center giving each ligand a +1 charge and the Ge a -1 charge. Natural population analysis, a computational technique associated with NBO assigns a charge of +0.64 to the Ge atom, indicating that charge delocalization is significant, and that the structure is best described as an intermediate between the two limiting representations. This compound adopts a pyramidal geometry, with a stereochemically active lone pair on Ge.

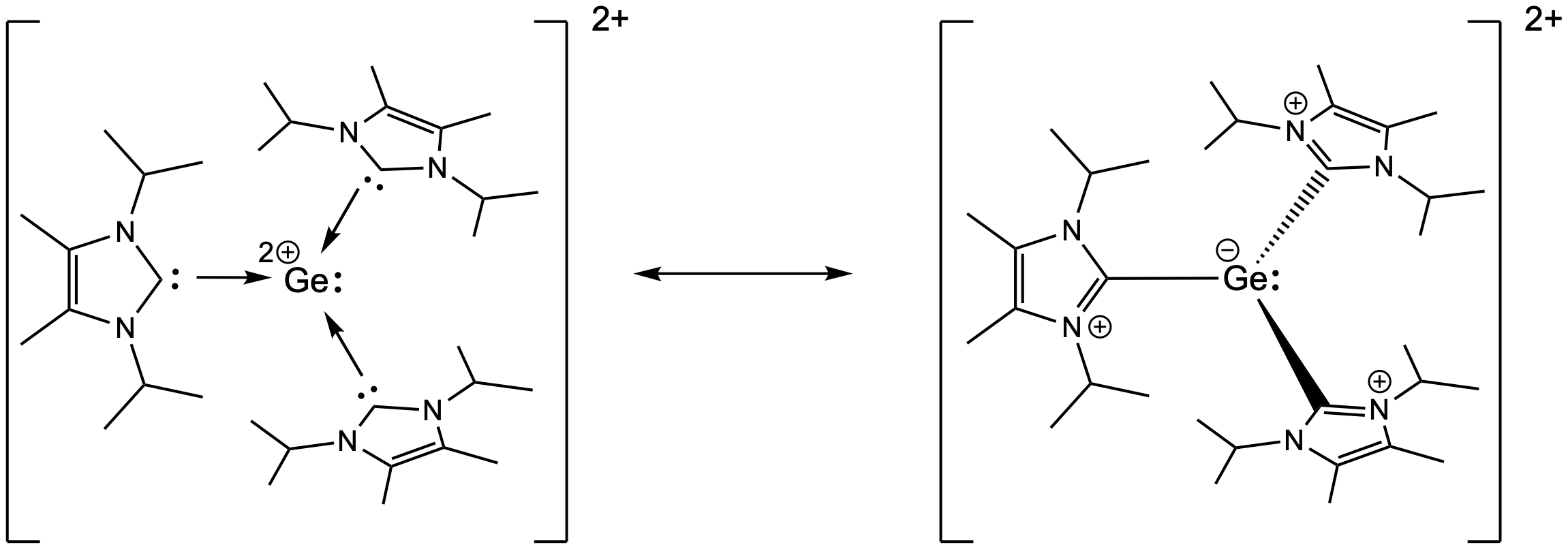
Possible representations of the Ge(II) carbene complex

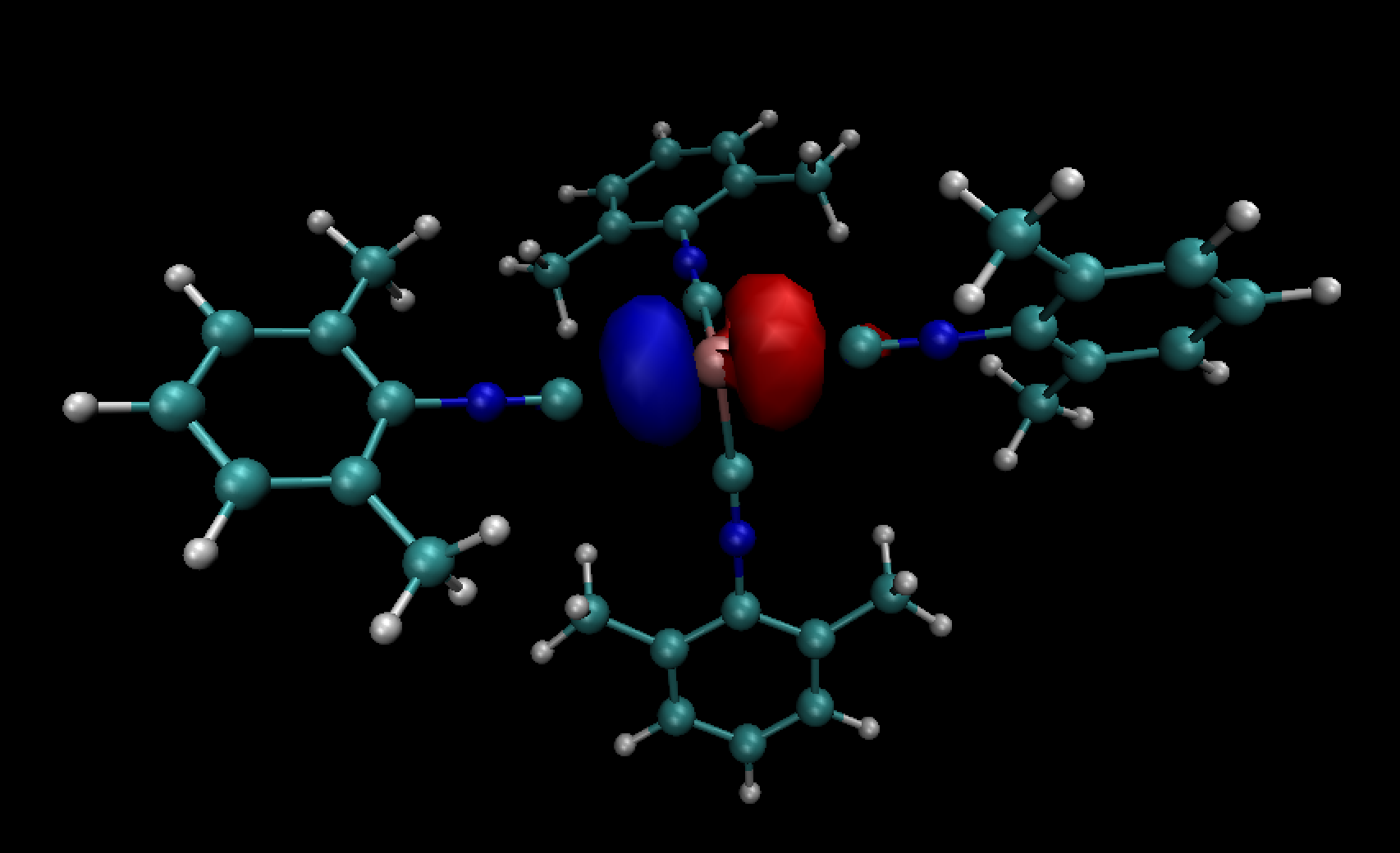
Visualization of the partially filled p orbital of the Ge(II) isocyanide dication

Similar to the Ge(II) carbene complex, the Ge-C bond lengths in the Ge(II) (2,6-dimethylphenyl isocyanide)_{3} structure range between 2.03-2.07 Å, typical for expected Ge-C bonds. The ligands adopt a distorted tetrahedral structure about the germanium center in the crystal structure. NBO analysis of the Ge(II) isocyanide dication reveals a partially filled Ge p orbital as a frontier orbital of this complex, depicted to the right. The nature of the frontier orbitals change upon consideration of the GeCl_{3}^{−} counter anions in the NBO analysis. The NBO analysis also reveals a charge of +0.74 on Ge, with some positive charge delocalized on the isocyanide ligands. Geometry optimizations for both singlet and triplet electron configurations were performed for this complex, and the singlet was found to be favored by 48.6 kcal/mol.

== Reactivity ==
The weakly coordinated Ge(II) cations are Lewis acids. Due to this weak coordination, such Ge(II) crown ether complexes could be useful for the preparation of other germanium compounds. Bandyopadhyay et al. have investigated the reactivity of a GeOTf^{+} [15]crown-5 complex, and found that the weakly coordinating triflate could be exchanged for H_{2}O or NH_{3}. Addition of water to a solution of GeOTf^{+} [15]crown-5 in dichloromethane results in the formation of the dicationic water complex, as depicted in the figure below. This water adduct was isolated and the structure was determined by X-ray crystallography, making it the first characterized Ge(II)-water adduct. Further addition of bulk water to this complex results in decomposition.

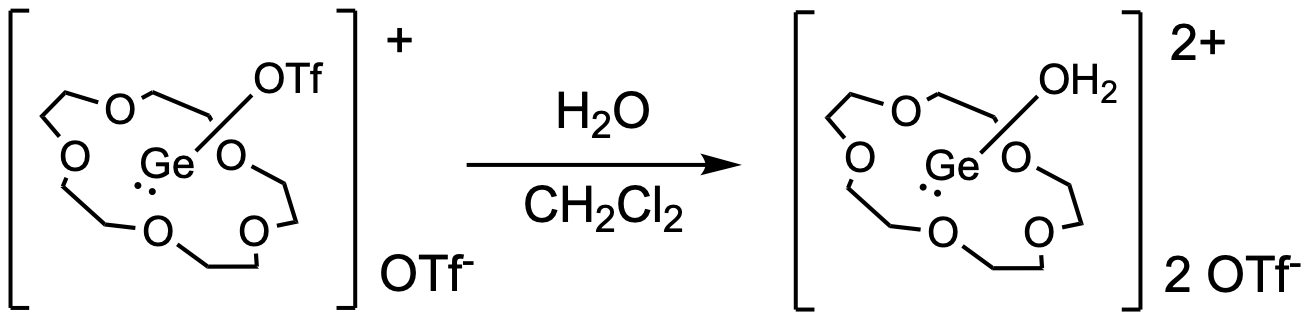
Displacement of a coordinating triflate ion with water

Upon treatment with base, this water adduct [Ge[15]crown-5·OH_{2}]^{2+}can be deprotonated to give the hydroxide adduct [Ge[15]crown-5·OH]^{+}. Upon deprotonation to give the hydroxide adduct, the Ge-O bond becomes shorter and stronger. NBO analysis identifies the H_{2}O-Ge[15]crown-5 interaction as a donor-acceptor interaction, while the HO-Ge[15]crown-5 interaction is identified as a polar single bond. This reactivity presents a potential strategy for the preparation of new Ge complexes.

The empty p orbitals of Ge(II) dications make them potential π-acceptors for transition metal complexes. Intriguingly, dicationic Ge(II) complexes have been shown to act as ligands for Au(I) and Ag(I). Raut and Majumdar report the use of a bis(α-iminopyridine) ligand to prepare a Ge(II) dicationic complex that coordinates to the electron rich Au(I) or Ag(I) metal centers. The bonding in such complexes is best described by σ-donation of the Ge(II) lone pair to the transition metal, and π-back donation from the filled transition metal d orbitals to the vacant Ge(II) p orbitals. This unusual activity for Ge(II) is under investigation for possible applications in catalysis.

== See also ==
- Cryptand
- Host–guest chemistry
- Organogermanium compounds
