= Macrocyclic ligand =

In coordination chemistry, a macrocyclic ligand is a macrocyclic ring having at least nine atoms (including all heteroatoms) and three or more donor sites that serve as ligands. Crown ethers and porphyrins are prominent examples. Macrocyclic ligands often exhibit high affinity for metal ions, the macrocyclic effect.

== History ==
Porphyrins and phthalocyanines have long been recognized as potent ligands in coordination chemistry as illustrated by numerous transition metal porphyrin complexes and the commercialization of copper phthalocyanine pigments. In the 1960s the synthesis of macrocylic ligands received much attention. One early contribution involved the synthesis of the "Curtis macrocycles", in which a metal ion serves as a template for ring formation.

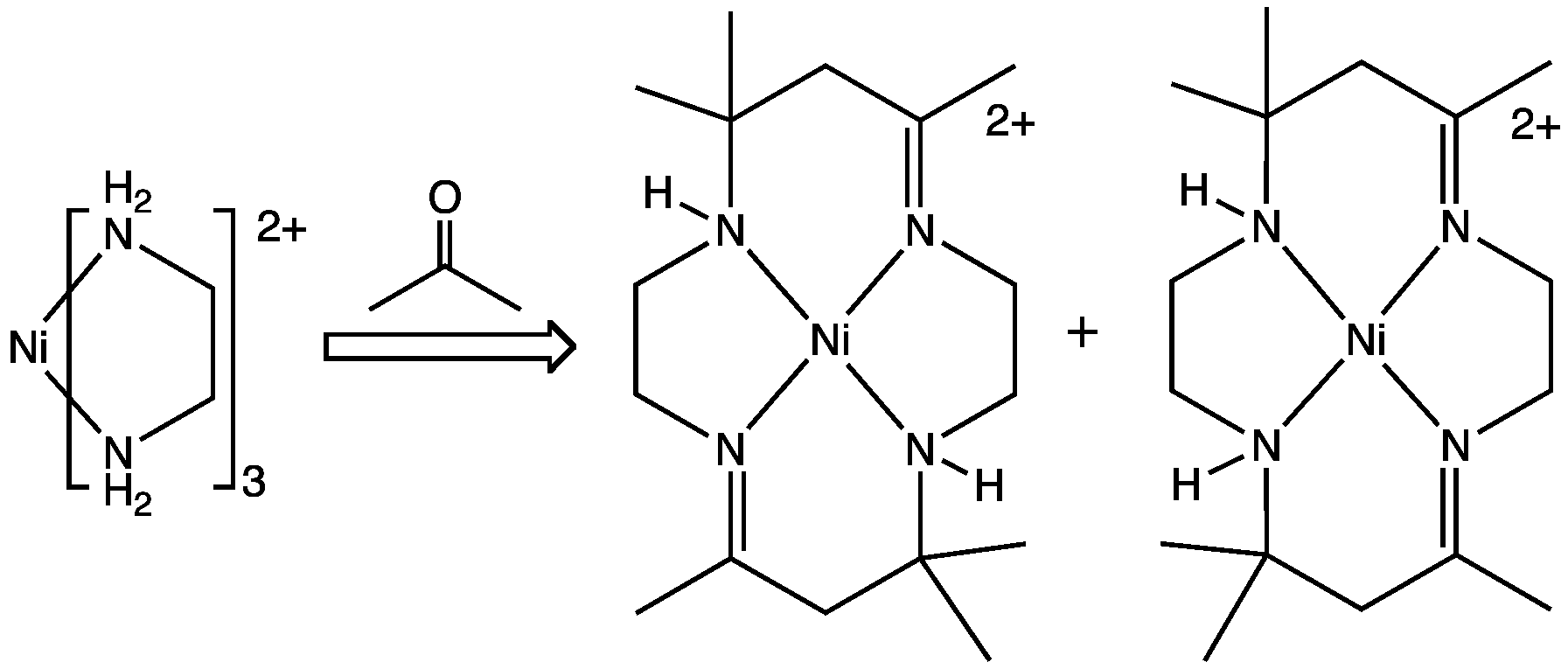
14-membered N4 macrocyclic ligands, called Curtis macrocycles, arise from the condensation of acetone and a nickel complex of ethylenediamine.

Polyether macrocycles - or "crown" ligands - were also developed at that time. A few years later, three-dimensional analogs of crown ethers called "cryptands" were reported by Lehn and co-workers.

== Macrocyclic effect ==
Some Macrocyclic Ligands and Their Complexes

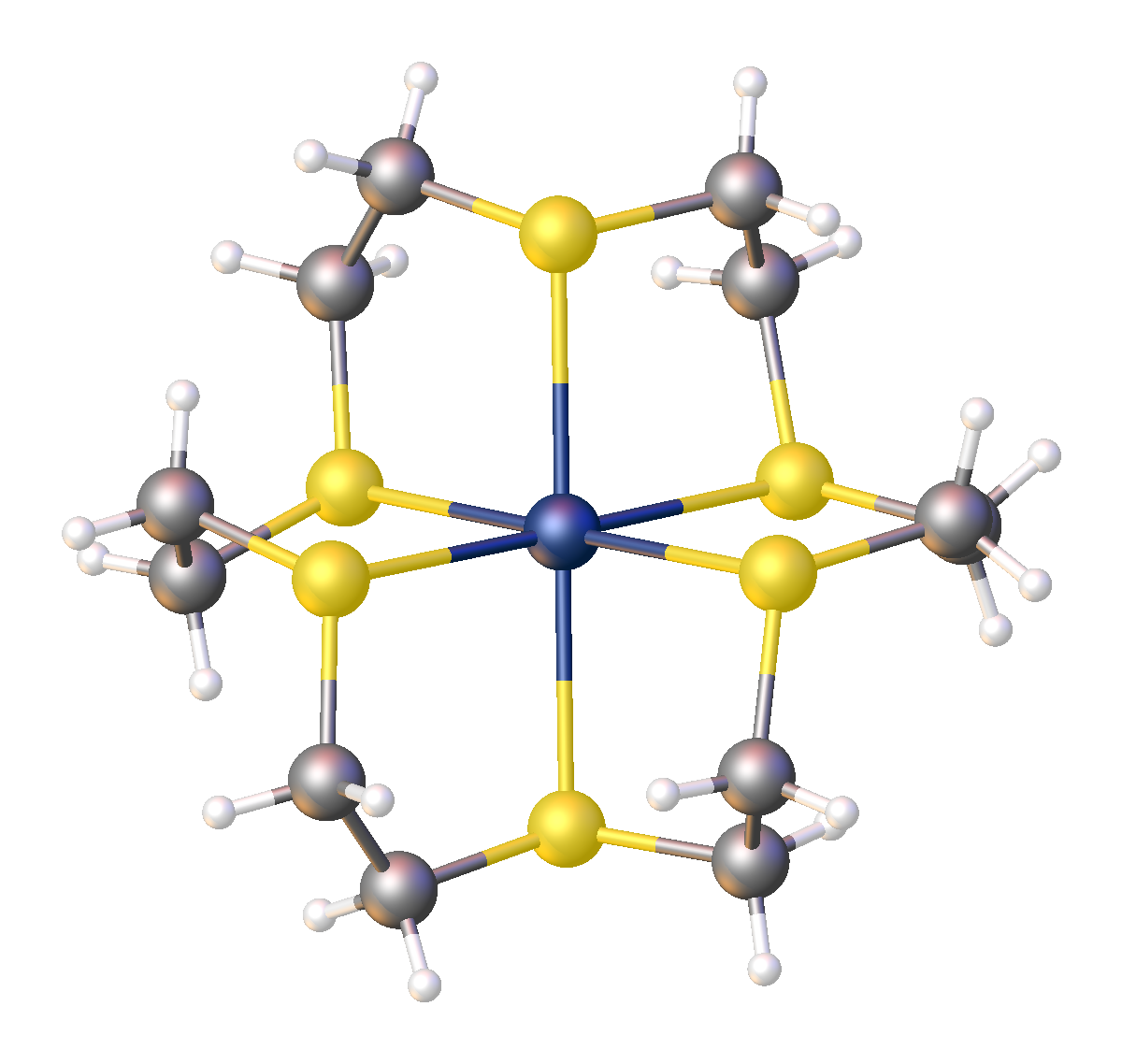
The silver complex of a thia-crown ether [Ag(18-ane-S6)]^{2+}

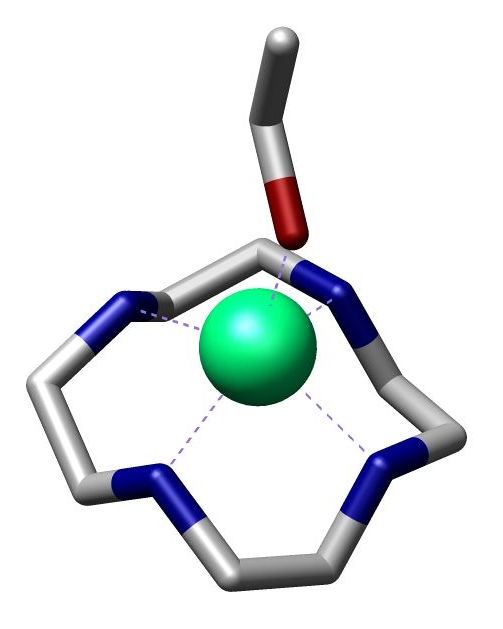
Crystal structure of a Zn(II)-cyclen-ethanol dication.

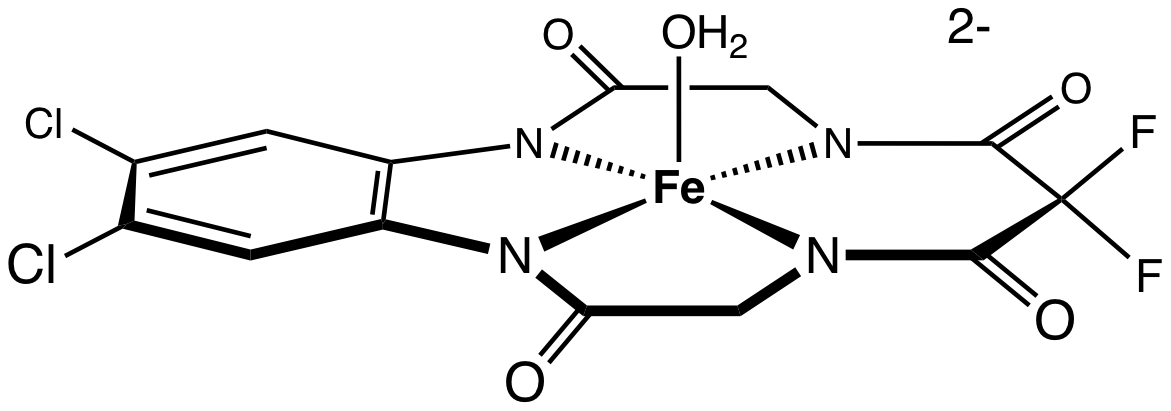
Fe-TAML complex.

1,4,7-Triazacyclononane is a tridentate ligand, which is prepared without metal templating.

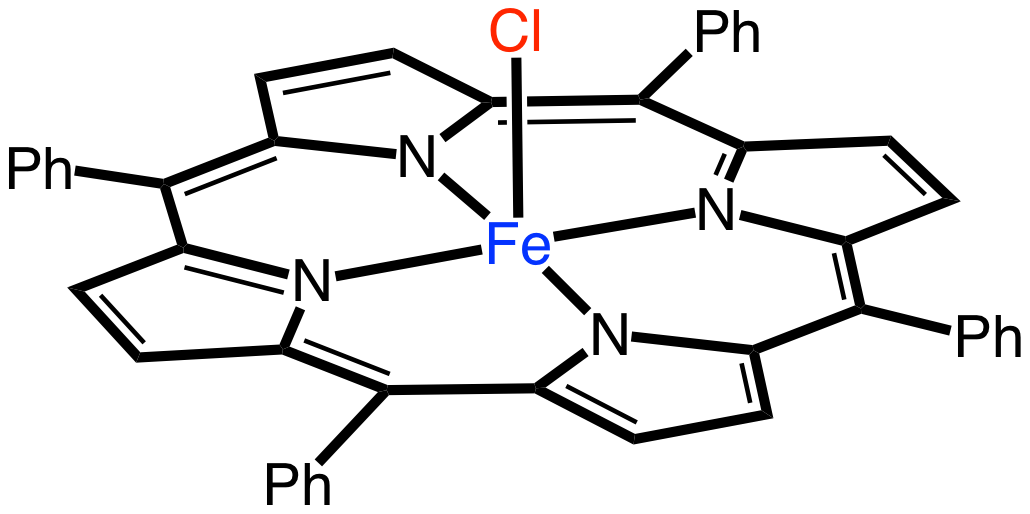
Iron(tetraporphyriinato) chloride

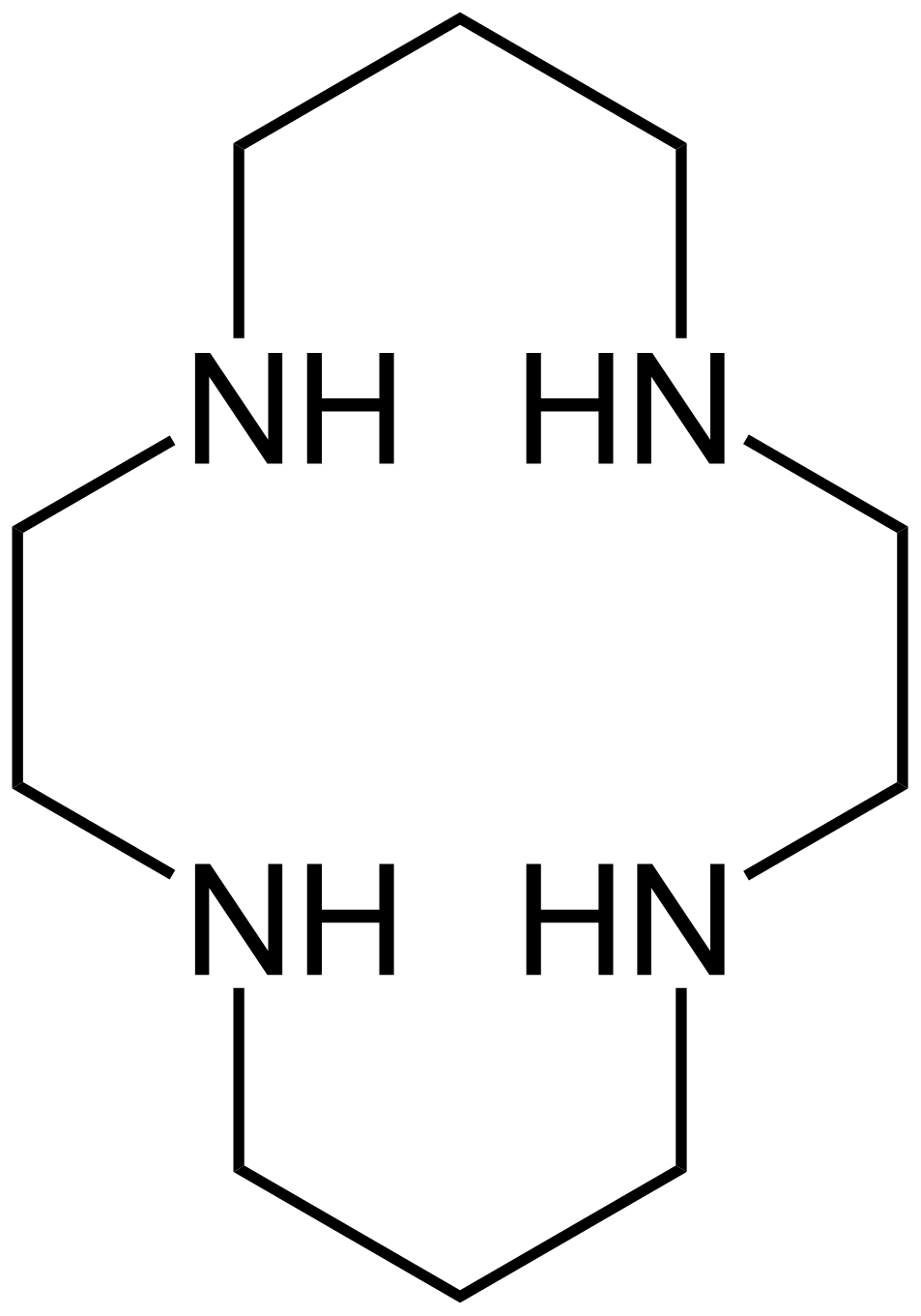
cyclam is a popular aza-crown ether

The macrocyclic effect is the high affinity of metal cations for macrocyclic ligands, compared to their acyclic analogues. The high affinity of macrocyclic ligands is thought to be a combination of the entropic effect seen in the chelate effect, together with an additional energetic contribution that comes from the preorganized nature of the ligating groups (that is, no additional strains are introduced to the ligand on coordination).

== Synthesis ==
In general, macrocyclic complexes are synthesized by combining macrocyclic ligands and metal ions.

In template reactions, macrocyclic ligands are synthesized in the presence of metal ions. In the absence of the metal ion, the same organic reactants may produce different, often polymeric, products. The metal ion may direct the condensation preferentially to cyclic rather than polymeric products (the kinetic template effect) or stabilize the macrocycle once formed (the thermodynamic template effect). The template effect makes use of the pre-organization provided by the coordination sphere of the metal. The coordination modifies the electronic properties such as the acidity and electrophilicity of the ligands. When the metal atom is not desired in the final product, a disadvantage of templated synthesis is the difficulty in removing the templating metal from the macrocyclic ligand.

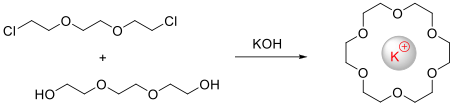
18-Crown-6 can be synthesized by the Williamson ether synthesis using potassium ion as the template cation.

Phthalocyanines were the first macrocycles synthesized by template reaction. Featuring planar, dianionic, 18-membered rings with four nitrogenous ligands, phthalocyanines resemble porphyrins.

The size of the metal cation used as the template has proved to be of importance in directing the synthetic pathway for the Schiff base systems. The compatibility between the radius of the template cation and the "hole" of the macrocycle contributes to the effectiveness of the synthetic pathway and to the geometry of the resulting complex.

== Uses and occurrence ==
Phthalocyanines, as their metal complexes, are arguably the most commercially useful complex of a macrocyclic ligand. They are used as dyes and pigments such as phthalocyanine blue.

Macrocyclic ligands occur in many cofactors in proteins and enzymes. Of particular interest are tetraazamacrocycles.

Heme, the active site in the hemoglobin (the metalloprotein in blood that transports oxygen), is a porphyrin that contains iron. Chlorophyll, the green photosynthetic pigment found in plants, contains a chlorin ring. Vitamin B_{12} contains a corrin ring.
