= Metallacrown =

Large ring molecules made of mainly inorganic and metal atoms

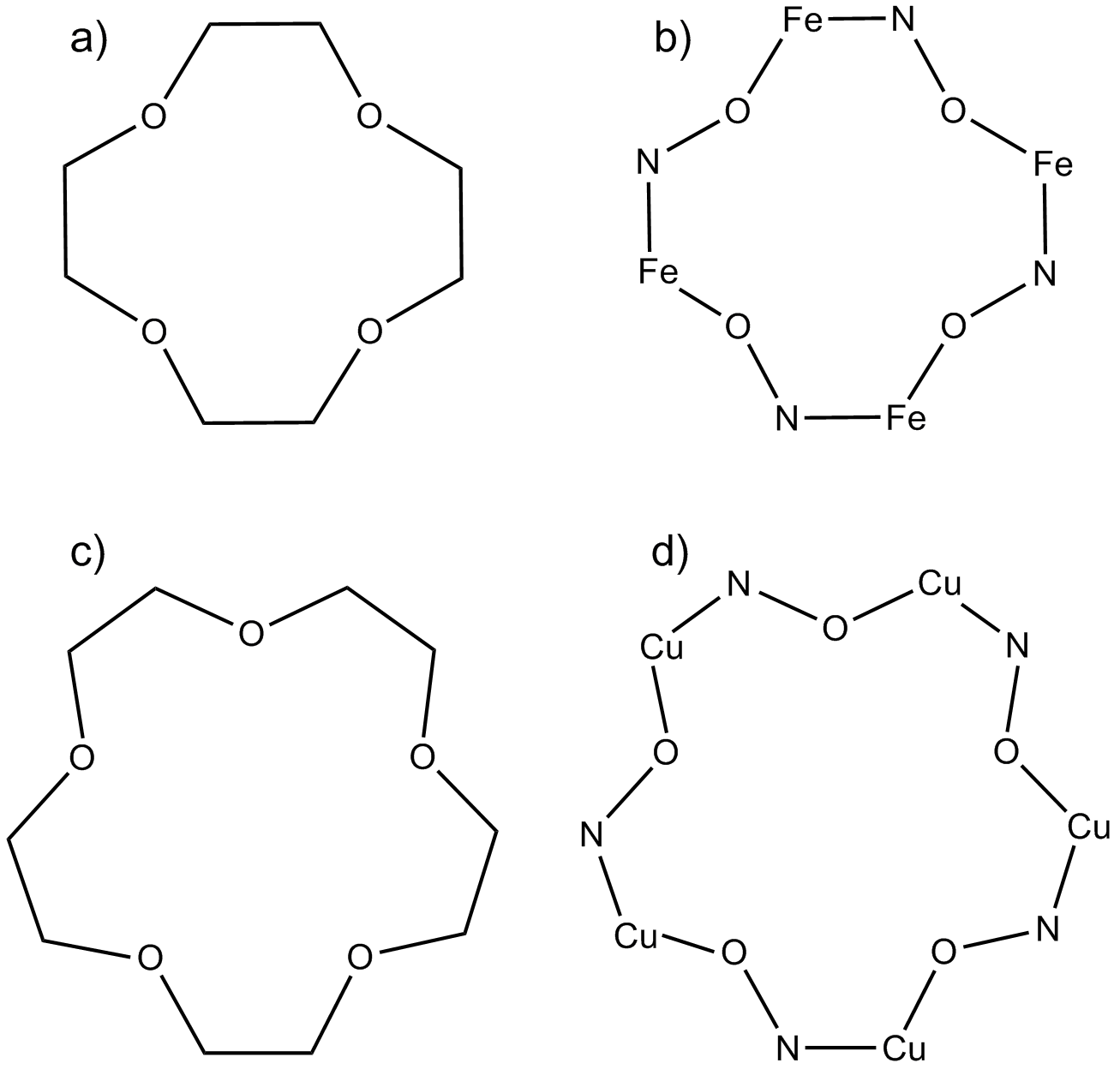
Figure showing the metallacrown analogy to the organic crown ether. Ligand substituents are omitted for clarity. a) 12-Crown-4 b) 12-MC_{Fe(III)N(shi)}-4 c) 15-Crown-5 d) 15-MC_{Cu(II)N(picHA)}-5

In chemistry, metallacrowns are a macrocyclic compounds that consist of metal ions and solely or predominantly heteroatoms in the ring. Classically, metallacrowns contain an [M–N–O] repeat unit in the macrocycle. First discovered by Vincent L. Pecoraro and Myoung Soo Lah in 1989, metallacrowns are best described as inorganic analogues of crown ethers. To date, over 600 reports of metallacrown research have been published. Metallacrowns with sizes ranging from 12-MC-4 to 60-MC-20 have been synthesized.

== Nomenclature ==
Metallacrown nomenclature has been developed to mimic the nomenclature of crown ethers, which are named by the total number of atoms in the ring, followed by "C" for "crown," and the number of oxygen atoms in the ring. For example, 12-crown-4 or 12-C-4 describes Figure 2a. When naming metallacrowns, a similar format is followed. However, the C becomes "MC" for "metallacrown" and the "MC" is followed by the ring metal, other heteroatom, and the ligand used to make the metallacrown. For example, metallacrown b in the figure above is named [12-MC_{Fe(III)N(shi)}-4], where "shi" is the ligand, salicylhydroxamic acid.

== Preparation ==
Metallacrowns form via self-assembly, i.e. by dissolving the ligand in a solvent followed by the desired metal salt. The first reported metallacrown was Mn^{II}(OAc)_{2}(DMF)_{6}[12-MC_{Mn(III)N(shi)}-4]. Metallacrowns can be prepared with a variety of metals in the ring and in a variety of ring sizes. Many metallacrowns have been prepared, including 9-MC-3, 15-MC-5, and 18-MC-6. Ring size is controlled by a number of factors, such as the geometry of the ligand chelate ring, ring metal Jahn–Teller distortion, central metal size, steric effects, and stoichiometry. Common ring metals have included V(III), Mn(III), Fe(III), Ni(II) and Cu(II). Hydroxamic acids, such as salicylhydroxamic acid, and oximes are commonly utilized in metallacrown ligands.

== Structure ==
Many structures have been characterized by single-crystal X-ray crystallography. Metallacrowns typically contain fused chelate rings in their structure, which imparts them with substantial stability. Metallacrowns have been synthesized with substantial variety. Mixed ligand and mixed ring-metal, and mixed-oxidation state metallacrowns are known. Inverse metallacrowns have been reported that contain metal ions oriented towards the center of the ring. Metallacryptates, metallahelicates, and fused metallacrowns are known. Among the interesting features of metallacrowns are the similarities between certain structures and the corresponding crown ether. For example, in the 12-C-4, the cavity size is 2.79 Å and the bite distance is 0.6 Å. In the 12-MC-4, the cavity size is 2.67 Å and the bite distance is 0.5 Å.

== Properties ==
Metallacrowns are most widely studied for their potential use as SMMs (single-molecule magnets). Notably, the first mixed manganese-lanthanide SMM was a metallacrown. Metallacrowns with gadolinium as the central metal are potential MRI contrast agents. A lot of attention is focused on metallacrown molecular recognition and host–guest chemistry. Chelation of heavy metals by 15-MC-5 complexes could be utilized in lanthanide separation or heavy metal sequestration. Metallacrown container molecules constructed from the 15-MC-5 structure type have been shown to selectively encapsulate carboxylate anions in hydrophobic cavities. A crystalline solid displaying second-harmonic generation was generated by including a nonlinear optical chromophore in a chiral metallacrown compartment. Metallacrowns have also been utilized in the construction of microporous. and mesoporous materials. In another potential application, some metallacrowns exhibit antibacterial activity.
