= TAML =

TAML or Taml may refer to:

- Tamil script (ISO 15924 code)
- Tetra-amido macrocyclic ligand, class of macrocyclic ligands
