= Salicylhydroxamic acid =

Enzyme inhibitor that inhibits urease

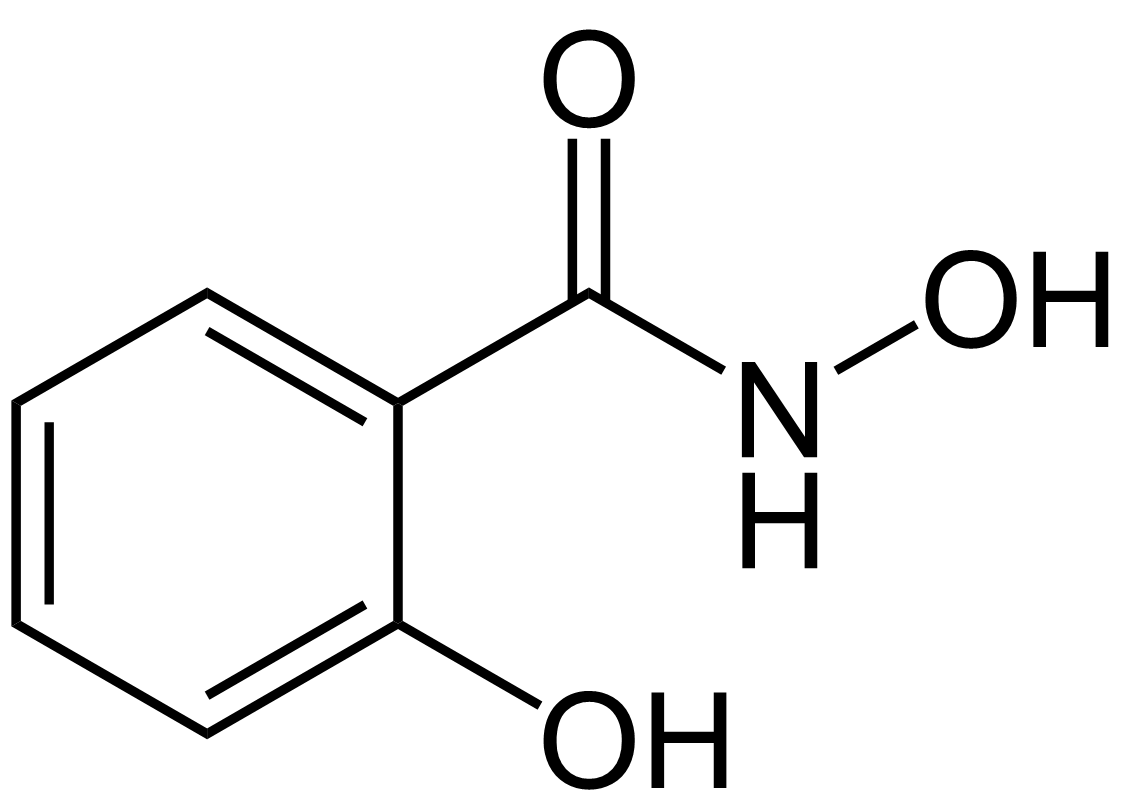

Names
- Preferred IUPAC name N,2-Dihydroxybenzamide
- Other names 2-Hydroxybenzenecarbohydroxamic acid

Identifiers
CAS Number	89-73-6
3D model (JSmol)	Interactive image
ChEBI	CHEBI:45615
ChEMBL	ChEMBL309339
ChemSpider	60011
ECHA InfoCard	100.001.759
PubChem CID	66644
UNII	8Q07182D0T
CompTox Dashboard (EPA)	DTXSID5075365
- InChI: InChI=1S/C7H7NO3/c9-6-4-2-1-3-5(6)7(10)8-11/h1-4,9,11H,(H,8,10) Key: HBROZNQEVUILML-UHFFFAOYSA-N; InChI=1/C7H7NO3/c9-6-4-2-1-3-5(6)7(10)8-11/h1-4,9,11H,(H,8,10) Key: HBROZNQEVUILML-UHFFFAOYAX
- SMILES: C1=CC=C(C(=C1)C(=O)NO)O

Properties
Chemical formula	C_{7}H_{7}NO_{3}
Molar mass	153.137 g·mol^{−1}
Appearance	Brownish crystalline powder
Melting point	175 to 178 °C (347 to 352 °F; 448 to 451 K)
- Except where otherwise noted, data are given for materials in their standard state (at 25 °C [77 °F], 100 kPa). verify (what is ?) Infobox references

Salicylhydroxamic acid (SHA or SHAM) is a drug that is a potent and irreversible enzyme inhibitor of the urease enzyme in various bacteria and plants; it is usually used for urinary tract infections. The molecule is similar to urea but is not hydrolyzable by urease; it thus disrupts the bacteria's metabolism through competitive inhibition. It is also a trypanocidal agent. When administered orally, it is metabolized to salicylamide, which exerts analgesic, antipyretic, and anti-inflammatory effects.

Salicylhydroxamic acid is also a common ligand utilized in the synthesis of metallacrowns.

In plants, some fungi and some protists with the alternative oxidase (AOX) enzyme in the mitochondrial electron transport chain system, salicylhdroxamic acid acts as an inhibitor of the enzyme, blocking the largely uninhibited flow of electrons through AOX. AOX acts as a "short circuit" of the normal electron chain, dissipating electrons with a much-decreased translocation of protons, and therefore diminished production of ATP by oxidative phosphorylation. When AOX is blocked by SHAM, electrons are forced through the cytochrome pathway and through complex IV, allowing observation of the operation of the cytochrome pathway without AOX activity. The AOX pathway is found to be the exclusive electron transport pathway in Trypanosoma brucei, the organism that causes African Sleeping Sickness, meaning that SHAM completely shuts down oxygen consumption by this organism.

== See also ==
- Acetohydroxamic acid
