= 1,4,7-Trithiacyclononane =

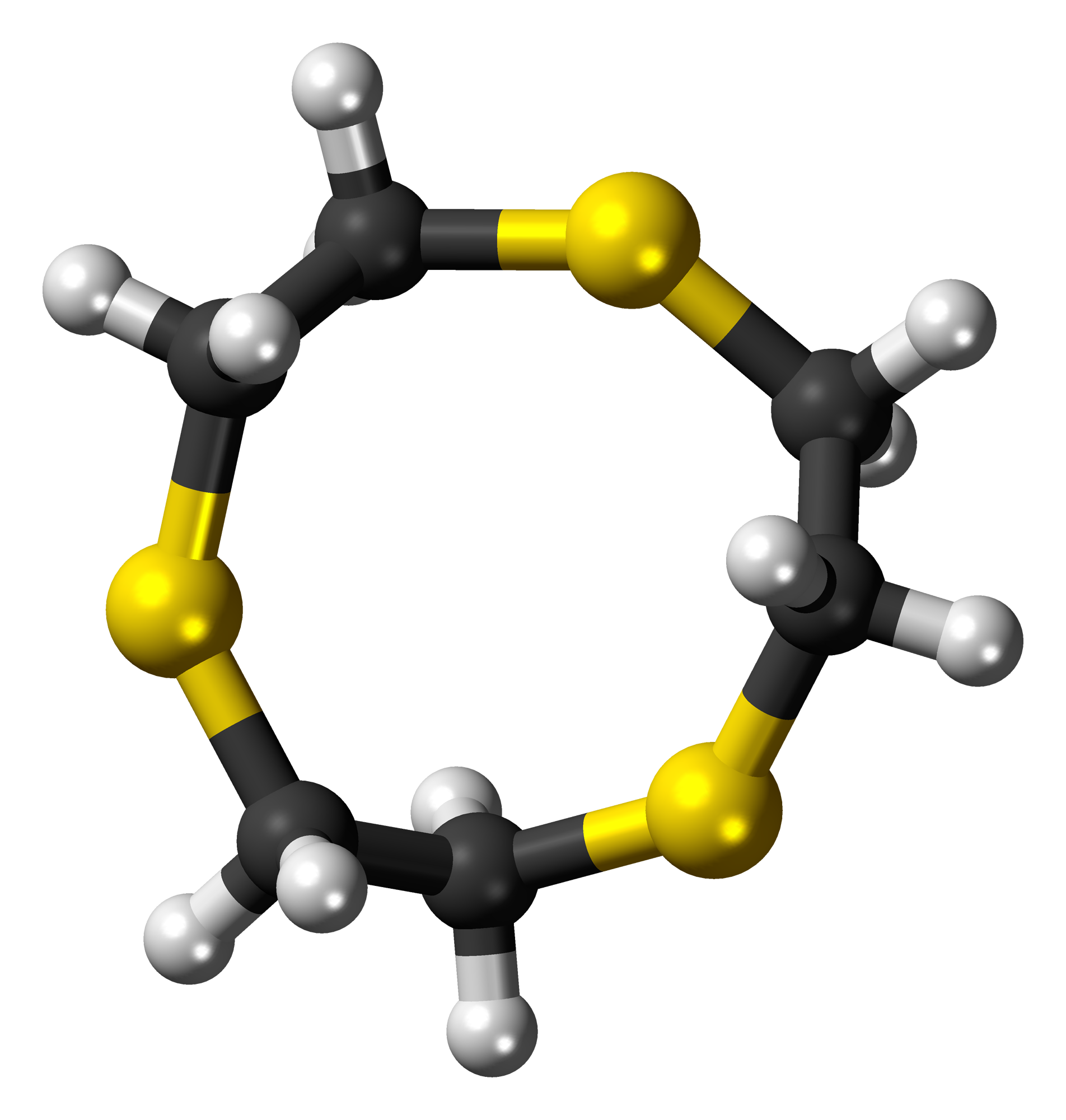

Names
- Preferred IUPAC name 1,4,7-Trithionane
- Other names 1,4,7-Trithiacyclononane, Triethylene trisulfide, 9-ane-S_{3}, [9]aneS_{3}

Identifiers
CAS Number	6573-11-1
3D model (JSmol)	Interactive image; Interactive image
ChEBI	CHEBI:37418
ChEMBL	ChEMBL1965619
ChemSpider	331656
ECHA InfoCard	100.150.510
EC Number	621-680-0
PubChem CID	373835
UNII	UD7TP2TQQ7
CompTox Dashboard (EPA)	DTXSID40215934
- InChI: InChI=1S/C6H12S3/c1-2-8-5-6-9-4-3-7-1/h1-6H2 Key: PQNPKQVPJAHPSB-UHFFFAOYSA-N; InChI=1/C6H12S3/c1-2-8-5-6-9-4-3-7-1/h1-6H2 Key: PQNPKQVPJAHPSB-UHFFFAOYAS
- SMILES: C1CSCCSCCS1; S1CCSCCSCC1

Properties
Chemical formula	C_{6}H_{12}S_{3}
Molar mass	180.35 g/mol
Appearance	Colourless solid
Melting point	78 to 81 °C (172 to 178 °F; 351 to 354 K)
Boiling point	decomposes
Solubility in water	Insoluble
Solubility	Chlorocarbons, acetone

Hazards
- Occupational safety and health (OHS/OSH)
Main hazards	Toxic
- GHS labelling
Pictograms	(GHS07: Exclamation mark)
Signal word	Warning
Hazard statements	H315, H319, H335
Precautionary statements	P261, P264, P271, P280, P302+P352, P304+P340, P305+P351+P338, P312, P321, P332+P313, P337+P313, P362, P403+P233, P405, P501

Related compounds
Related compounds	Thiirane, 1,3,5-Trithiane, 1,4,7-Triazacyclononane
- Except where otherwise noted, data are given for materials in their standard state (at 25 °C [77 °F], 100 kPa). verify (what is ?) Infobox references

1,4,7-Trithiacyclononane, also called 9-ane-S_{3}, is the thia-crown ether with the formula (CH_{2}CH_{2}S)_{3}. This cyclic thioether is most often encountered as a tridentate ligand in coordination chemistry, where it forms transition metal thioether complexes.

9-ane-S_{3} forms complexes with many metal ions, including those considered hard, such as copper(II) and iron(II). Most of its complexes have the formula [M(9-ane-S_{3})_{2}]^{2+} and are octahedral. The point group of [M(9-ane-S_{3})_{2}]^{2+} is S_{6}.

== Synthesis ==
This compound was first reported in 1977, and the current synthesis entails the assembly within the coordination sphere of a metal ion followed by decomplexation:

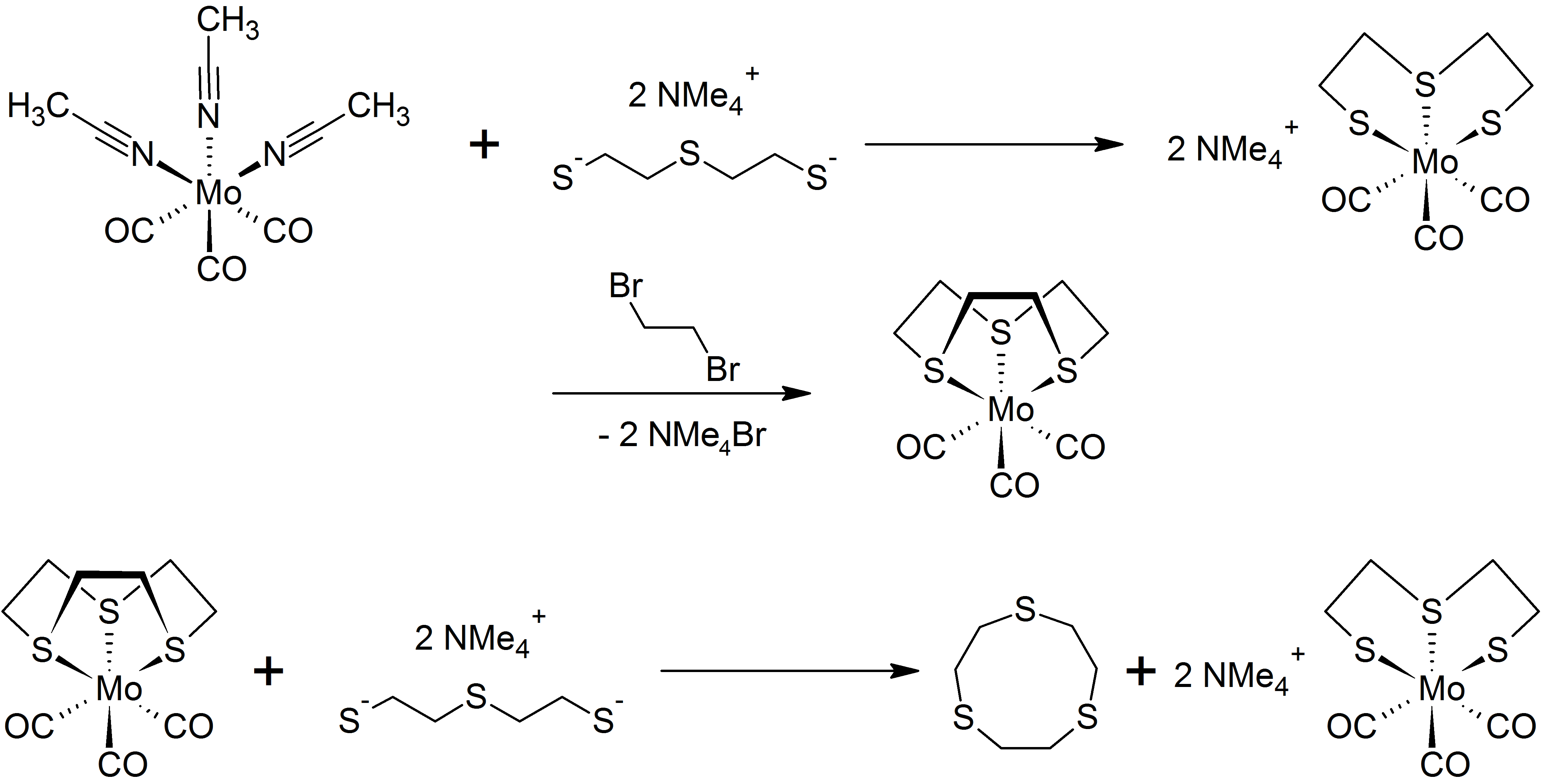
