= 21-Crown-7 =

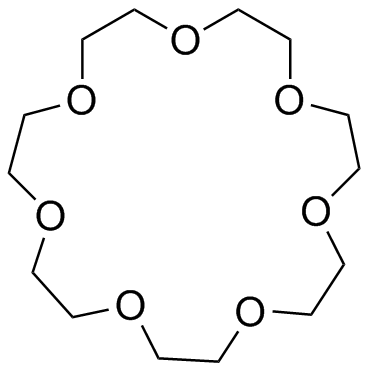
- Skeletal formula

Names
- Preferred IUPAC name 1,4,7,10,13,16,19-Heptaoxacyclohenicosane

Identifiers
CAS Number	33089-36-0
3D model (JSmol)	Interactive image
ChemSpider	84104
ECHA InfoCard	100.046.689
EC Number	251-373-3
PubChem CID	93160
UNII	GF978SJ9Z2
CompTox Dashboard (EPA)	DTXSID50186747
- InChI: InChI=1S/C14H28O7/c1-2-16-5-6-18-9-10-20-13-14-21-12-11-19-8-7-17-4-3-15-1/h1-14H2 Key: XKEHLMZHBXCJGZ-UHFFFAOYSA-N; InChI=1S/C14H28O7/c1-2-16-5-6-18-9-10-20-13-14-21-12-11-19-8-7-17-4-3-15-1/h1-14H2 Key: XKEHLMZHBXCJGZ-UHFFFAOYSA-N
- SMILES: O1CCOCCOCCOCCOCCOCCOCC1

Properties
Chemical formula	C_{14}H_{28}O_{7}
Molar mass	308.371 g·mol^{−1}

Related compounds
Related compounds	Dibenzo-21-crown-7
- Except where otherwise noted, data are given for materials in their standard state (at 25 °C [77 °F], 100 kPa). Infobox references

21-Crown-7 is an organic compound with the formula (C_{2}H_{4}O)_{7}. Similar to other crown ethers, 21-crown-7 functions as a ligand for certain metal cations, with a specific affinity for caesium cations. The dipole moment of 21-crown-7 varies depending on the solvent and temperatures.
