= 12-Crown-4 =

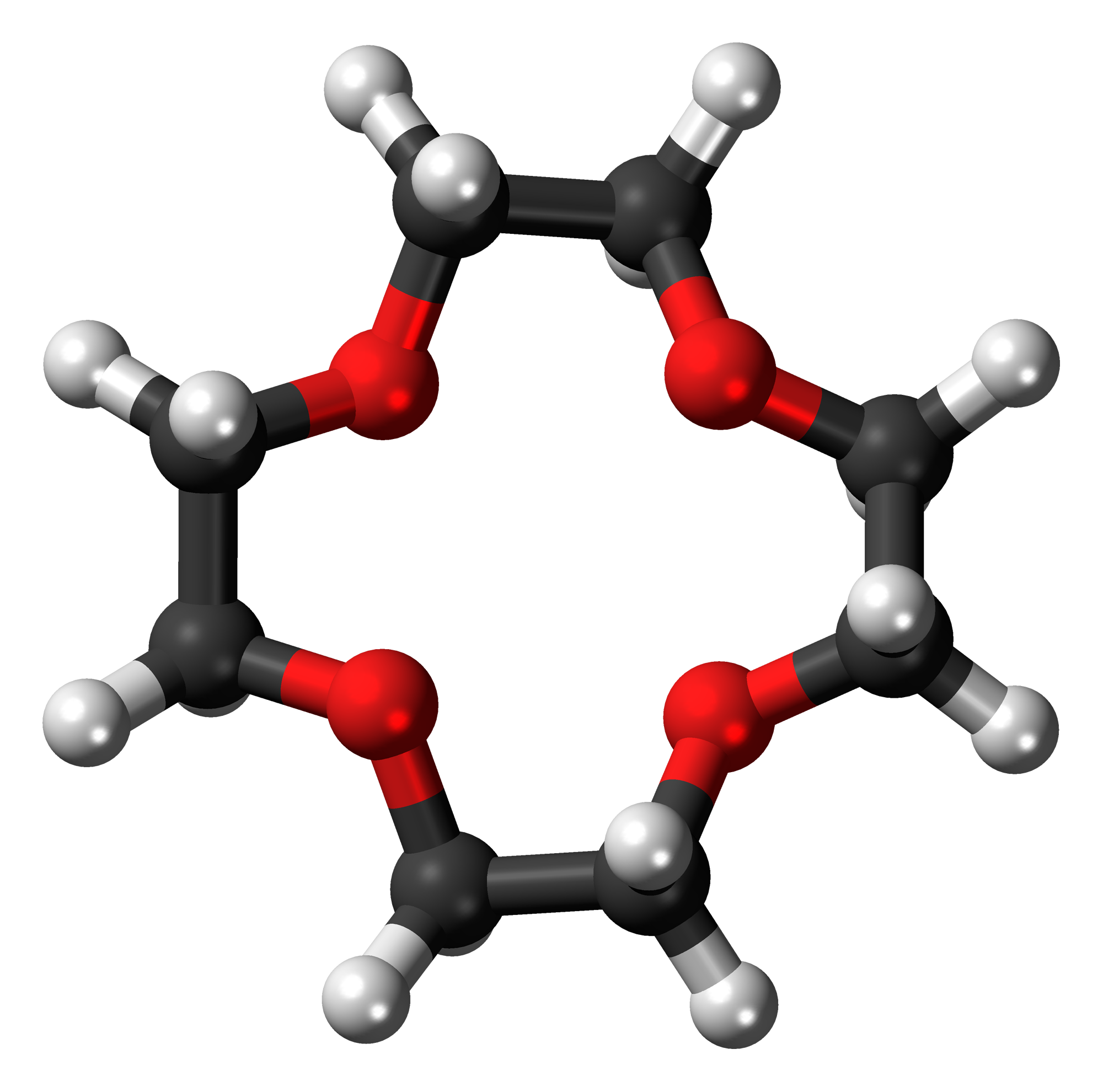

Names
- Preferred IUPAC name 1,4,7,10-Tetraoxacyclododecane
- Other names 12-crown-4, Lithium Ionophore V

Identifiers
CAS Number	294-93-9
3D model (JSmol)	Interactive image; Interactive image
Beilstein Reference	1363064
ChEBI	CHEBI:32399
ChemSpider	8912
ECHA InfoCard	100.005.488
EC Number	206-036-5
Gmelin Reference	3287
PubChem CID	9269
UNII	K6069P2C2A
CompTox Dashboard (EPA)	DTXSID6059780
- InChI: InChI=1S/C8H16O4/c1-2-10-5-6-12-8-7-11-4-3-9-1/h1-8H2 Key: XQQZRZQVBFHBHL-UHFFFAOYSA-N; InChI=1/C8H16O4/c1-2-10-5-6-12-8-7-11-4-3-9-1/h1-8H2 Key: XQQZRZQVBFHBHL-UHFFFAOYAA
- SMILES: O1CCOCCOCCOCC1; C1COCCOCCOCCO1

Properties
Chemical formula	C_{8}H_{16}O_{4}
Molar mass	176.21
Density	1.089 g/mL at 25 °C
Melting point	16 °C
Boiling point	61-70 °C/0.5 mm Hg
Solubility in water	Miscible

Hazards
Flash point	113 °C (235 °F; 386 K)
- Except where otherwise noted, data are given for materials in their standard state (at 25 °C [77 °F], 100 kPa). verify (what is ?) Infobox references

12-Crown-4, also called 1,4,7,10-tetraoxacyclododecane and lithium ionophore V, is a crown ether with the formula C_{8}H_{16}O_{4}. It is a cyclic tetramer of ethylene oxide which is specific for the lithium cation.

== Synthesis ==
12-Crown-4 can be synthesized using a modified Williamson ether synthesis, using LiClO_{4} as a templating cation:

(CH_{2}OCH_{2}CH_{2}Cl)_{2} + (CH_{2}OH)_{2} + 2 NaOH → (CH_{2}CH_{2}O)_{4} + 2 NaCl + 2 H_{2}O

It also forms from the cyclic oligomerization of ethylene oxide in the presence of gaseous boron trifluoride.

== Properties ==
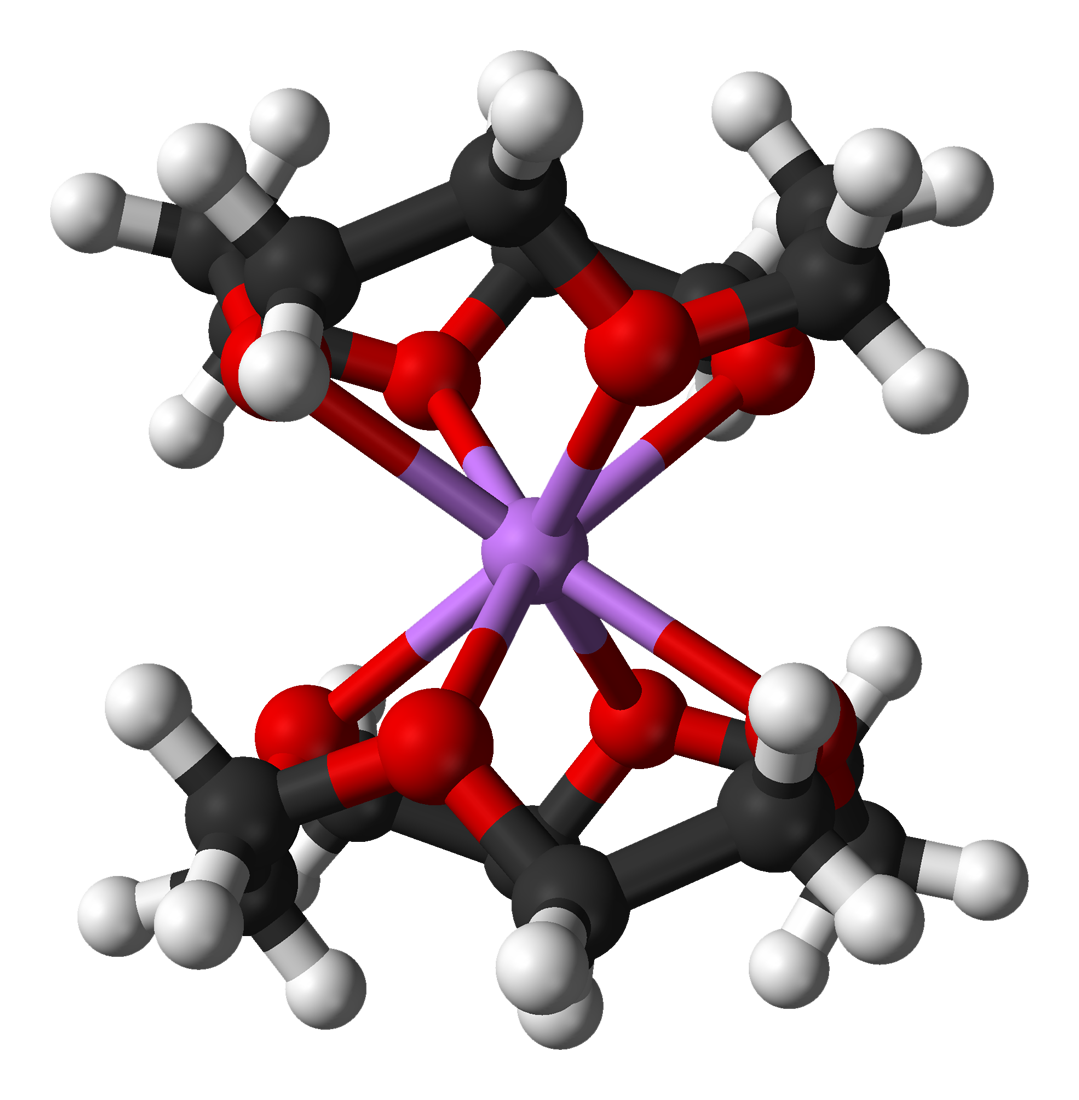
Ball-and-stick model of the bis(12-crown-4)lithium cation

Like other crown ethers, 12-crown-4 complexes with alkali metal cations. The cavity diameter of 1.2-1.5 Å gives it a high selectivity towards the lithium cation (ionic diameter 1.36 Å)

Its point group is S_{4}. The dipole moment of 12-crown-4 varies with solvent and temperature. At 25 °C, the dipole moment of 12-crown-4 was determined as 2.33 ± 0.03 D in cyclohexane and 2.46 ± 0.01 D in benzene.

== See also ==
- Crown ether
- Cyclen, a similar molecule with N atoms (aza groups) instead of O atoms (ethers)
