= 15-Crown-5 =

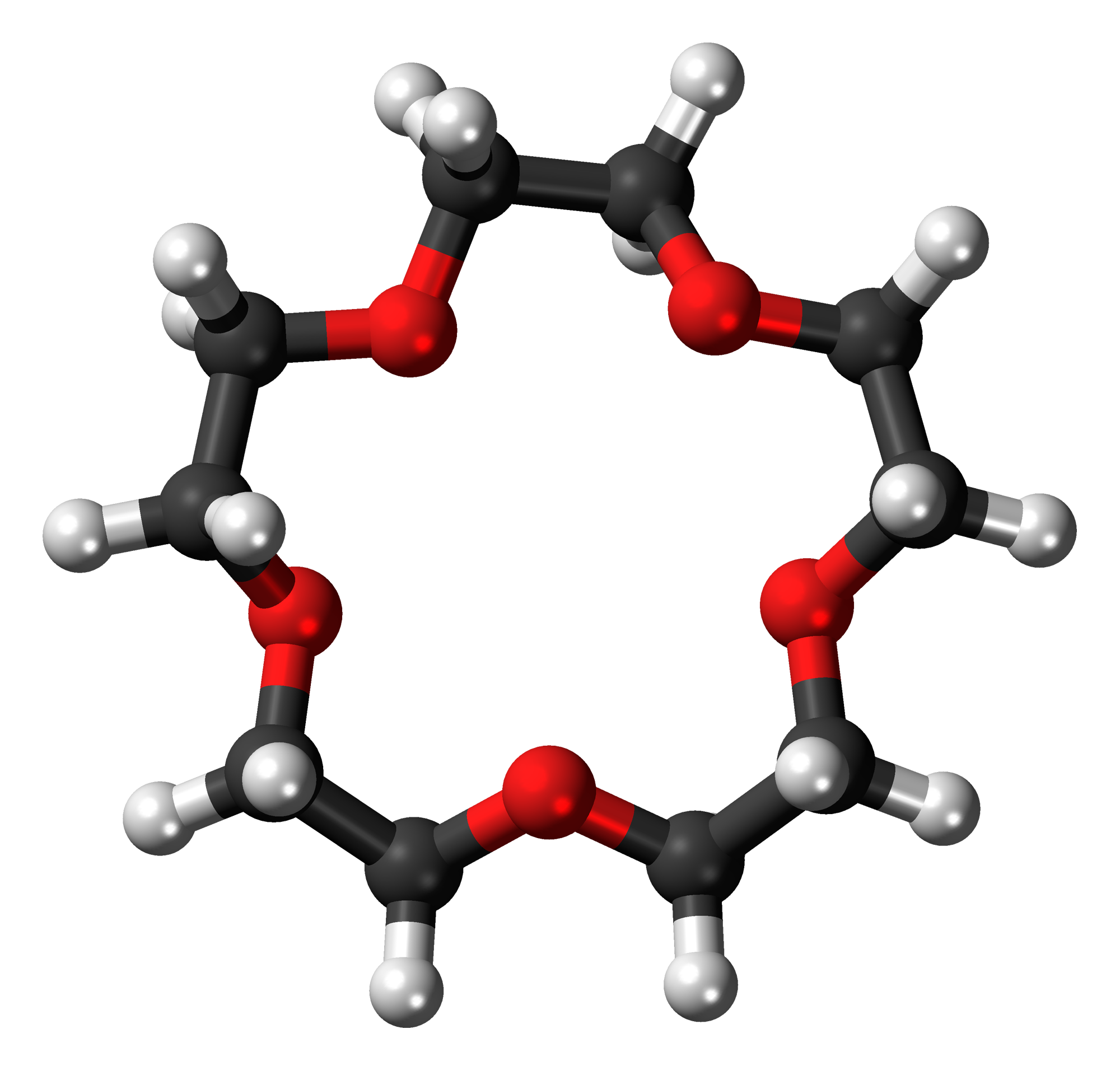

Names
- Preferred IUPAC name 1,4,7,10,13-Pentaoxacyclopentadecane

Identifiers
CAS Number	33100-27-5
3D model (JSmol)	Interactive image
Beilstein Reference	1618144
ChEBI	CHEBI:32401
ChEMBL	ChEMBL156289
ChemSpider	33416
ECHA InfoCard	100.046.694
EC Number	251-379-6
Gmelin Reference	3897
MeSH	15-Crown-5
PubChem CID	36336
RTECS number	SB0200000
UNII	7G6K9SB27Y
CompTox Dashboard (EPA)	DTXSID7067746
- InChI: InChI=1S/C10H20O5/c1-2-12-5-6-14-9-10-15-8-7-13-4-3-11-1/h1-10H2 Key: VFTFKUDGYRBSAL-UHFFFAOYSA-N; InChI=1/C10H20O5/c1-2-12-5-6-14-9-10-15-8-7-13-4-3-11-1/h1-10H2 Key: VFTFKUDGYRBSAL-UHFFFAOYAH
- SMILES: C1COCCOCCOCCOCCO1

Properties
Chemical formula	C_{10}H_{20}O_{5}
Molar mass	220.265 g·mol^{−1}
Appearance	colorless liquid
Density	1.113 g cm^{−3} (at 20 °C)
Boiling point	93–96 °C (199–205 °F; 366–369 K) at 0.05 mmHg
log P	−0.639
Refractive index (n_{D})	1.465

Thermochemistry
Std enthalpy of formation (Δ_{f}H^{⦵}_{298})	−881.1 to −877.1 kJ mol^{−1}
Std enthalpy of combustion (Δ_{c}H^{⦵}_{298})	−5.9157 to −5.9129 MJ mol^{−1}

Hazards
- GHS labelling
Pictograms	(GHS07: Exclamation mark)
Signal word	Warning
Hazard statements	H302, H315, H319
Precautionary statements	P305+P351+P338
NFPA 704 (fire diamond)	2 1 0
Flash point	113 °C (235 °F; 386 K)
Safety data sheet (SDS)	msds.chem.ox.ac.uk
- Except where otherwise noted, data are given for materials in their standard state (at 25 °C [77 °F], 100 kPa). verify (what is ?) Infobox references

15-Crown-5 is a crown ether with the formula (C_{2}H_{4}O)_{5}. It is a cyclic pentamer of ethylene oxide. It forms a complex with various cations, including sodium (Na^{+}) and potassium (K^{+}); with a preference for the former.

== Synthesis ==
15-Crown-5 can be synthesized using a modified Williamson ether synthesis:

(CH_{2}OCH_{2}CH_{2}Cl)_{2} + O(CH_{2}CH_{2}OH)_{2} + 2 NaOH → (CH_{2}CH_{2}O)_{5} + 2 NaCl + 2 H_{2}O

It also forms from the cyclic oligomerization of ethylene oxide in the presence of gaseous boron trifluoride.

== Properties ==
Analogous to 18-crown-6, 15-crown-5 binds to sodium ions. Thus, when treated with this complexing agent, sodium salts often become soluble in organic solvents.

First-row transition metal dications fit snugly inside the cavity of 15-crown-5. They are too small to be included in 18-crown-6. The binding of transition metal cations results in multiple hydrogen-bonded interactions from both equatorial and axial aqua ligands, such that highly crystalline solid-state supramolecular polymers can be isolated. Metal salts isolated in this form include Co(ClO_{4})_{2}, Ni(ClO_{4})_{2}, Cu(ClO_{4})_{2}, and Zn(ClO_{4})_{2}. Seven coordinate species are most common for transition metal complexes of 15-crown-5, with the crown ether occupying the equatorial plane, along with 2 axial aqua ligands.

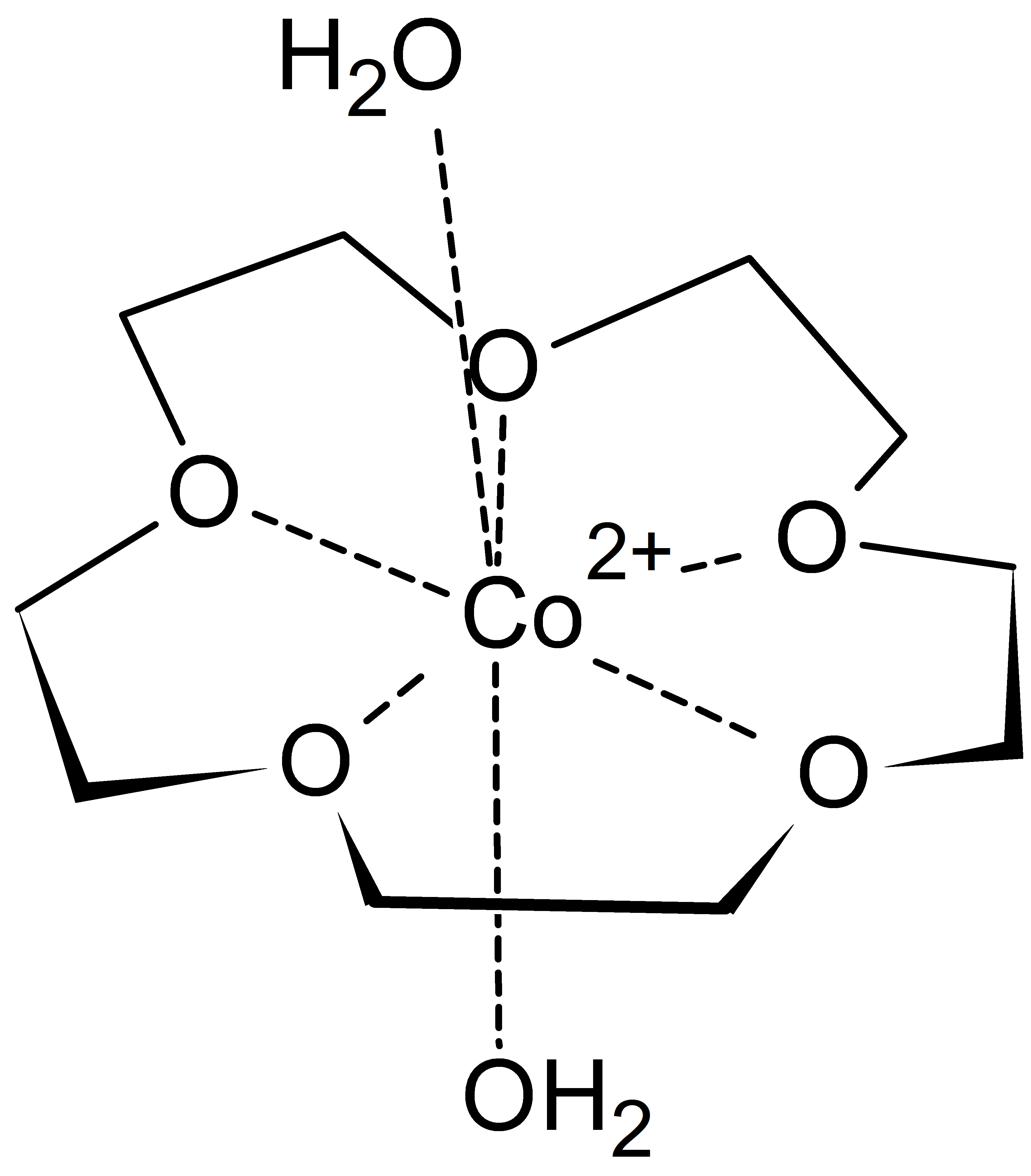
The structure of the complex [Co(15-crown-5)(H_{2}O)_{2}]^{2+}.

15-crown-5 has also been used to isolate salts of oxonium ions. For example, from a solution of tetrachloroauric acid, the oxonium ion [H_{7}O_{3}]^{+} has been isolated as the salt [(H_{7}O_{3})(15-crown-5)_{2}][AuCl_{4}]. Neutron diffraction studies revealed a sandwich structure, which shows a chain of water with remarkably long O-H bond (1.12 Å) in the acidic proton, but with a very short OH•••O distance (1.32 Å).

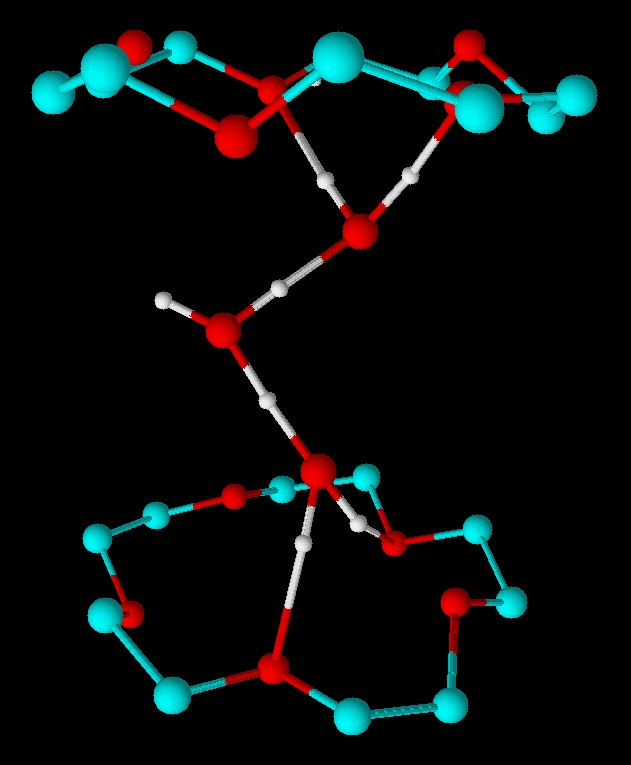
Structure of [(H_{7}O_{3})(15-crown-5)_{2}]^{+} ion

A derivative of 15-crown-5, benzo-15-crown-5, has been used to produce anionic complexes of carbido ligands as their [K(benzo-15-crown-5)_{2}]^{+} salts:

(Ar_{2}N)_{3}MoCH + KCH_{2}Ph + 2 (15-crown-5) → [K(15-crown-5)_{2}]^{+}[(Ar_{2}N)_{3}MoC]^{−} + CH_{3}Ph

In 2026, a study demonstrated that 15-crown-5 can act as a structural matrix to isolate otherwise unstable molecular forms. Specifically, within a 15-crown-5 hydroxylaminosolvate crystal structure, molecules of hydroxylamine were successfully trapped and observed for the first time as a stable cyclic dimer (NH_{2}OH)_{2}.

== See also ==
- Host guest chemistry
- Phase transfer catalyst
