= Tetra-amido macrocyclic ligand =

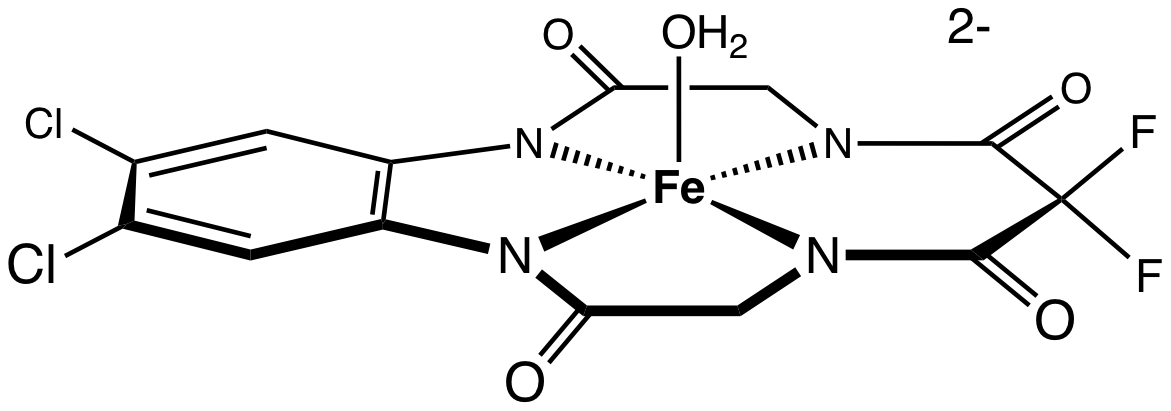
Structure of an Fe-TAML complex.

Tetra-amido macrocyclic ligands (TAMLs) constitute a class of macrocyclic ligands. When complexed to metals, TAMLs are proposed as environmentally friendly catalysts. Although never commercialized, iron-TAML complexes catalyze the degradation of pesticides, effluent streams from paper mills, dibenzothiophenes from diesel fuels, and anthrax spores.
