= Oligomer =

Molecule composed of copies of a small unit

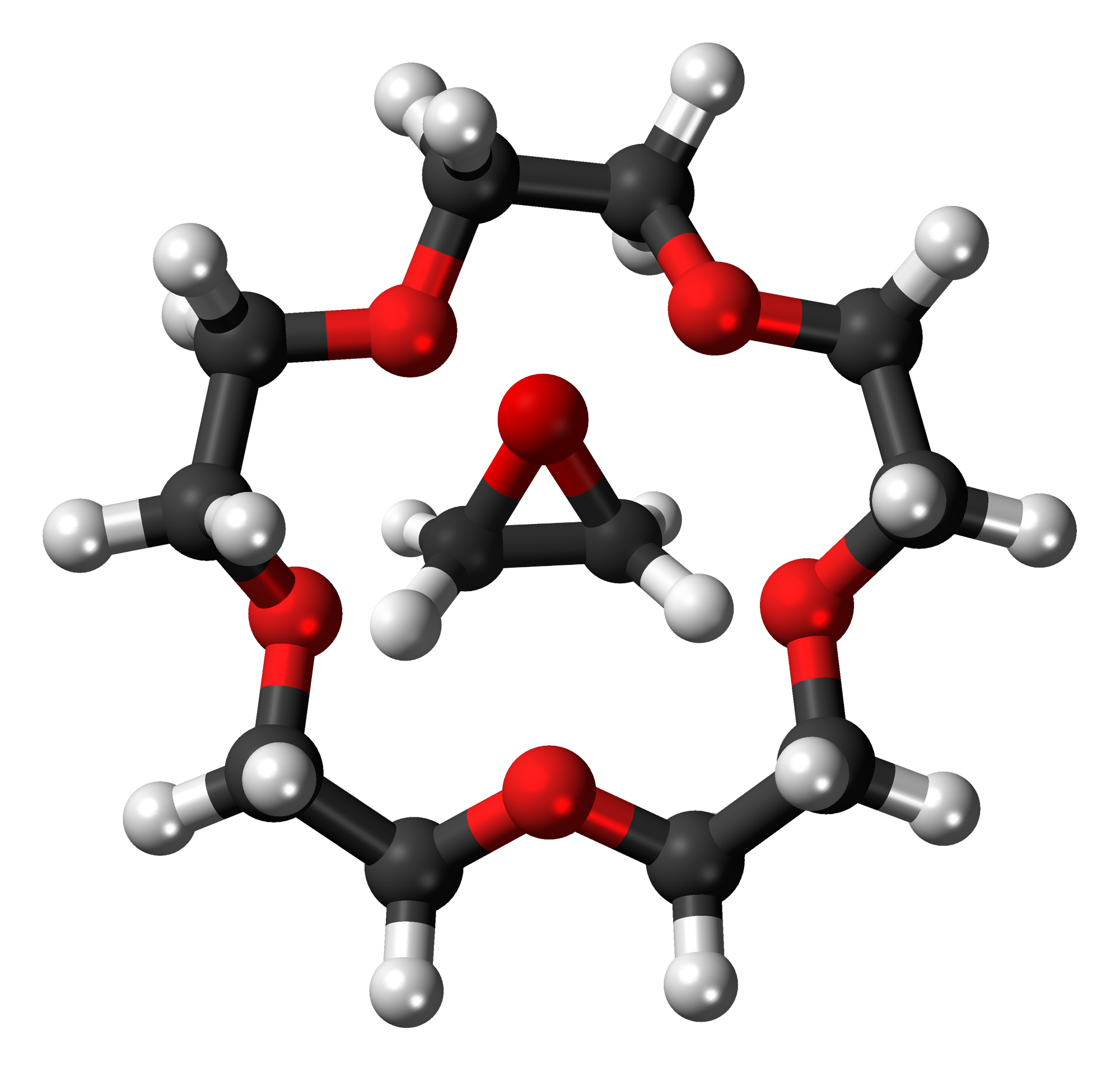
The 15-crown-5 crown ether, a cyclic oligomer, and its monomer, ethylene oxide.

In chemistry and biochemistry, an oligomer (/əˈlɪɡəmər/) is a molecule that consists of a few repeating units which could be derived, actually or conceptually, from smaller molecules, monomers. The name is composed of Greek elements oligo-, "a few" and -mer, "parts". An adjective form is oligomeric.

The oligomer concept is contrasted to that of a polymer, which is usually understood to have a large number of units, possibly thousands or millions. However, there is no sharp distinction between these two concepts. One proposed criterion is whether the molecule's properties vary significantly with the removal of one or a few of the units.

An oligomer with a specific number of units is referred to by the Greek prefix denoting that number, with the ending -mer: thus dimer, trimer, tetramer, pentamer, and hexamer refer to molecules with two, three, four, five, and six units, respectively. The units of an oligomer may be arranged in a linear chain (as in melam, a dimer of melamine); a closed ring (as in 1,3,5-trioxane, a cyclic trimer of formaldehyde); or a more complex structure (as in tellurium tetrabromide, a tetramer of TeBr_{4} with a cube-like core). If the units are identical, one has a homo-oligomer; otherwise one may use hetero-oligomer. An example of a homo-oligomeric protein is collagen, which is composed of three identical protein chains.

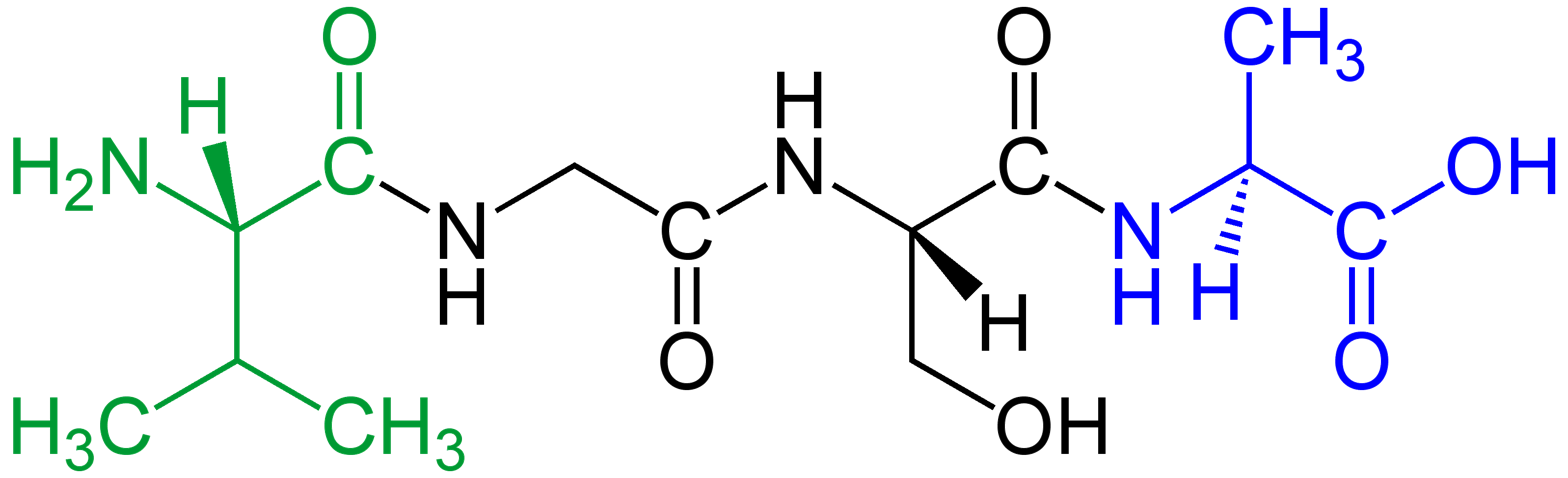
A tetrapeptide, a hetero-oligomer of the amino acids valine (green), glycine (black), serine (black), and alanine (blue). The units were joined by condensation of the carboxylic acid group –C(=O)OH of one monomer with the amine group H_{2}N− of the next one.

Some biologically important oligomers are macromolecules like proteins or nucleic acids; for instance, hemoglobin is a protein tetramer. An oligomer of amino acids is called an oligopeptide or just a peptide. An oligosaccharide is an oligomer of monosaccharides (simple sugars). An oligonucleotide is a short single-stranded fragment of nucleic acid such as DNA or RNA, or similar fragments of analogs of nucleic acids such as peptide nucleic acid or Morpholinos.

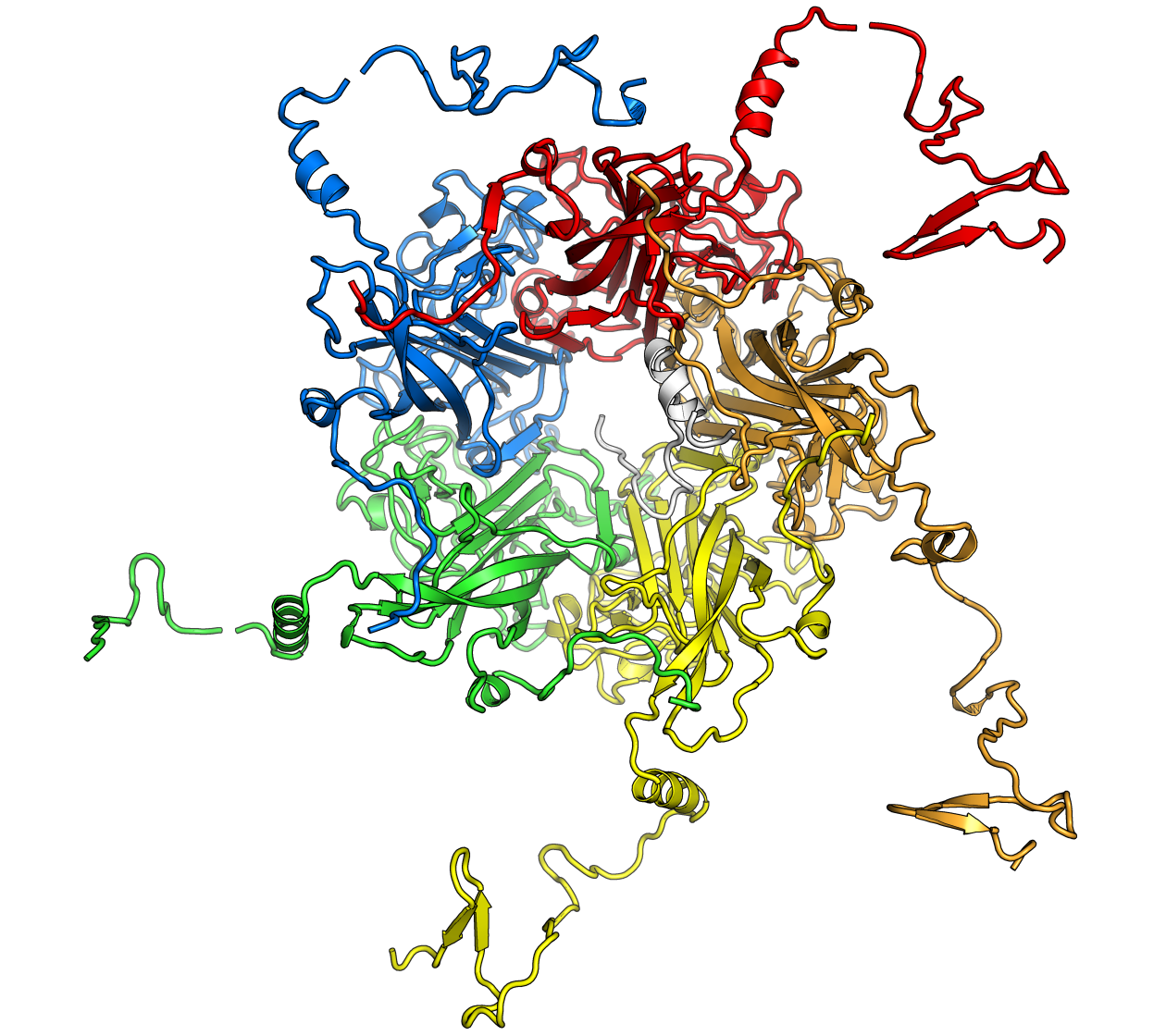
A pentamer unit of the major capsid protein VP1. Each monomer is in a different color.

The units of an oligomer may be connected by covalent bonds, which may result from bond rearrangement or condensation reactions, or by weaker forces such as hydrogen bonds. The term multimer (/ˈmʌltɪmər/) is used in biochemistry for oligomers of proteins that are not covalently bound. The major capsid protein VP1 that comprises the shell of polyomaviruses is a self-assembling multimer of 72 pentamers held together by local electric charges.

Many oils are oligomeric, such as liquid paraffin. Plasticizers are oligomeric esters widely used to soften thermoplastics such as PVC. They may be made from monomers by linking them together, or by separation from the higher fractions of crude oil. Polybutene is an oligomeric oil used to make putty.

Oligomerization is a chemical process that converts monomers to macromolecular complexes through a finite degree of polymerization. Telomerization is an oligomerization carried out under conditions that result in chain transfer, limiting the size of the oligomers. (This concept is not to be confused with the formation of a telomere, a region of highly repetitive DNA at the end of a chromosome.)

== "Green oil" ==
Green oil refers to a mixture of C4 to C20 unsaturated and reactive components generated during the attempted selective hydrogenation of acetylene contaminant in ethylene that is used to produce polyethylene. A palladium-silver catalyst is intended to promote hydrogenation of the acetylene to ethylene. In a significant and undesirable side reaction, some acetylene is converted to butadiene and higher oligomers.

== See also ==
- GPCR oligomer
- Oligomery (botany)
- Protein oligomer
