= Thia-crown ether =

Ring molecules with several sulfide (–S–) groups

The structure of (CH_{2}CH_{2}S)_{3} (9-ane-S3)

In organic chemistry, thia-crown ethers are organosulfur compounds which are the thia analogues of crown ethers (cyclic polyethers). That is, they have a sulfur atom (sulfide linkage, −S−) in place of each oxygen atom (ether linkage, −O−) around the ring. While the parent crown ethers have the formulae (CH_{2}CH_{2}O)_{n}, the parent thia-crown ethers have the formulae (CH_{2}CH_{2}S)_{n}, where n = 3, 4, 5, 6. They have trivial names "x-ane-Sy", where x and y are the number of atoms in the ring and the number of those atoms that are sulfur, respectively. Thia-crown ethers exhibit affinities for transition metals.

1,4,7-Trithiacyclononane (9-ane-S3) is a tridentate ligand and forms complexes with many metal ions, including those considered hard, such as copper(II) and iron(II).

Tetradentate 14-ane-S4 and the hexadentate 18-ane-S6 are also known. Evaluation of antibacterial activities of some thia crown ethers indicated that they can be considered as inhibitors for S. aureus methicillin resistance and P. aeruginosa. In addition, some of these compounds were screened for their antibacterial and antifungal activity on Klebsiella pneumoniae, Staphilococcus aureus, Pseudomonas aeruginosa and Candida albicans.

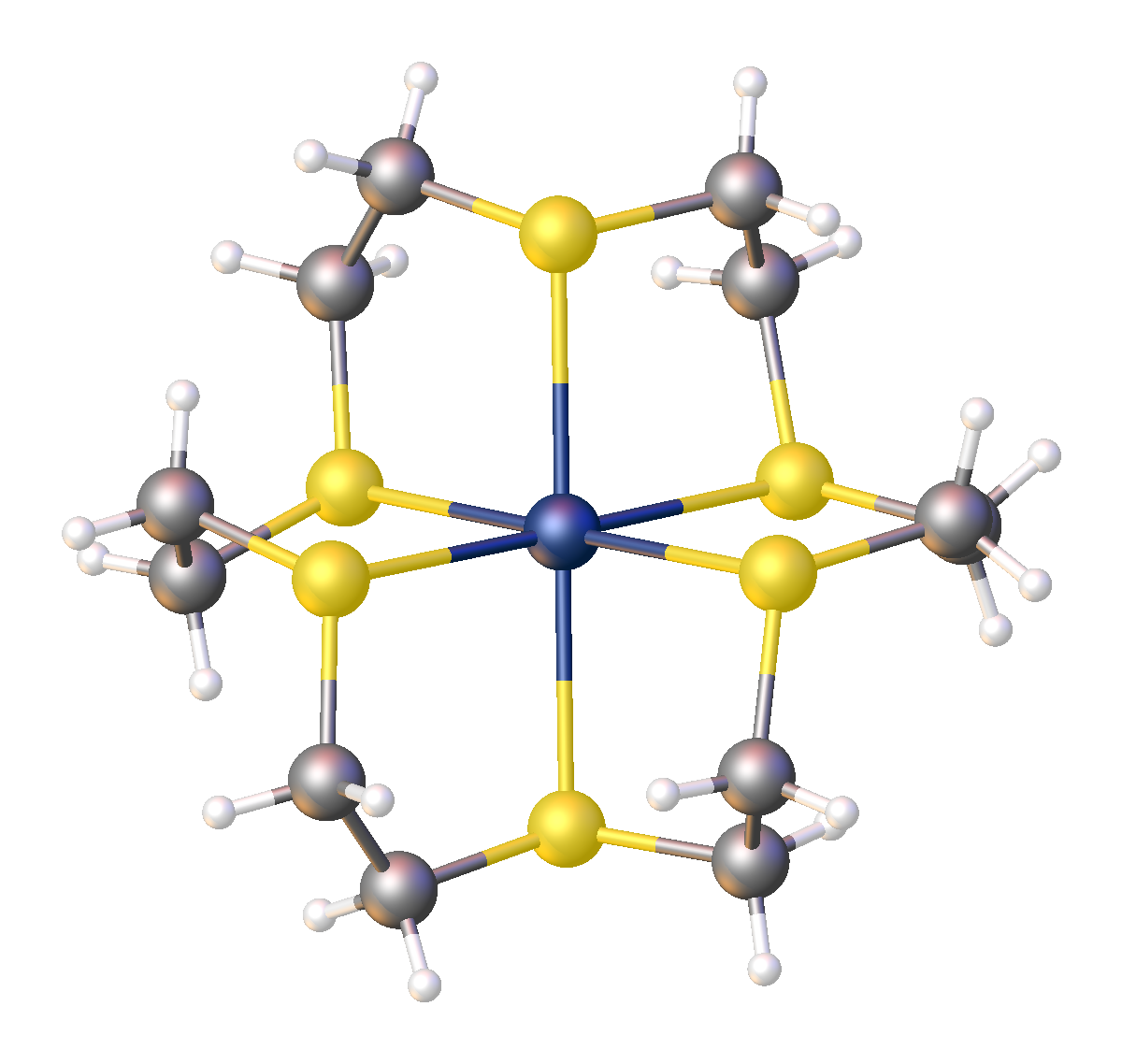
Structure of the silver complex of a thiacrown ether [Ag(18-ane-S6)]^{2+}.
