= Crown ether =

Ring molecules with several ether (–O–) groups

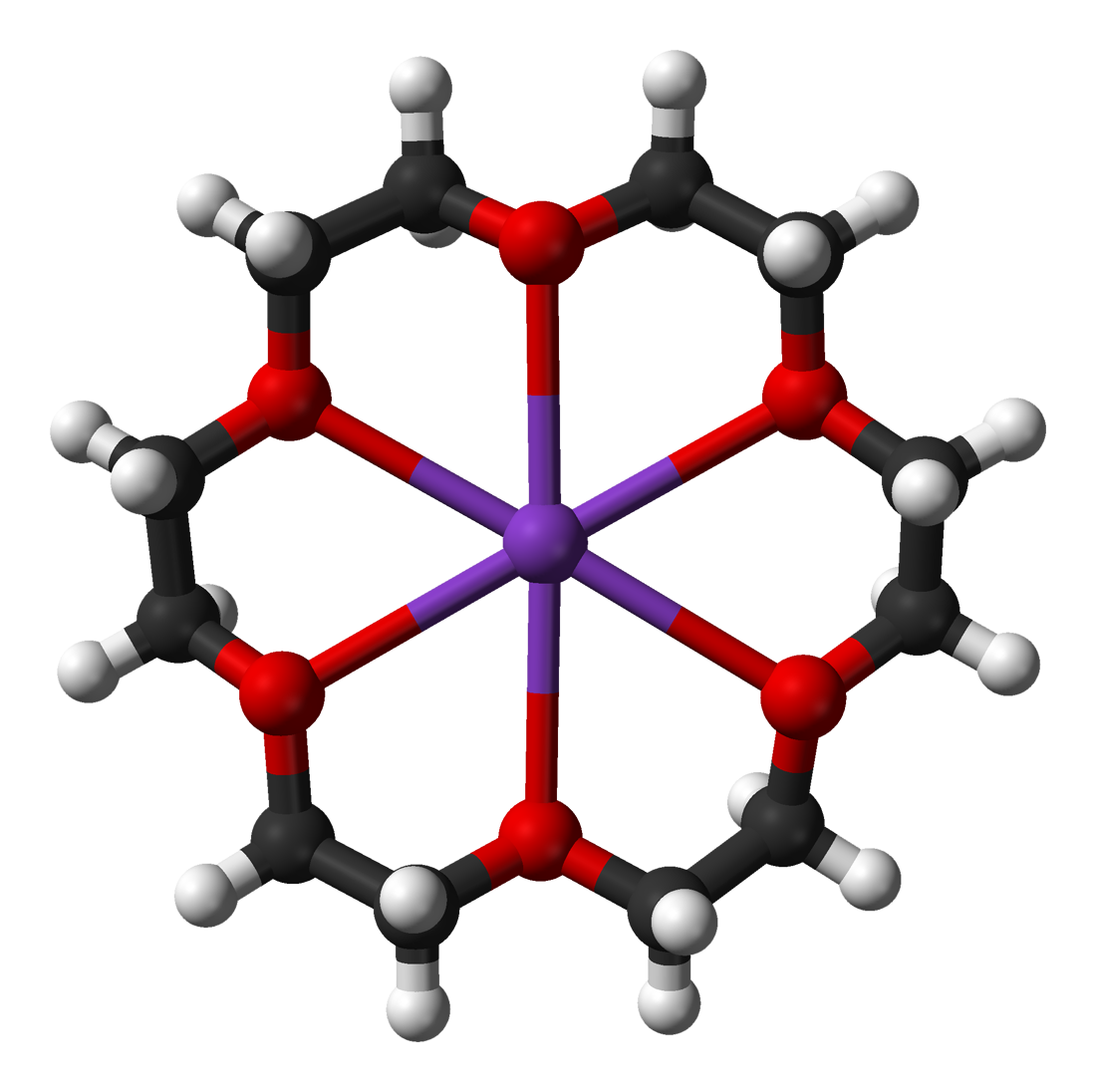
18-Crown-6 coordinating to a potassium ion

In organic chemistry, crown ethers are cyclic chemical compounds that consist of a ring containing several ether groups (R−O−R'). The most common crown ethers are cyclic oligomers of ethylene oxide, the repeating unit being ethyleneoxy, i.e., −CH_{2}CH_{2}O−. Important members of this series are the tetramer (n = 4), the pentamer (n = 5), and the hexamer (n = 6). The term "crown" refers to the resemblance between the structure of a crown ether bound to a cation, and a crown sitting on a person's head. The first number in a crown ether's name refers to the number of atoms in the cycle, and the second number refers to the number of those atoms that are oxygen. Crown ethers are much broader than the oligomers of ethylene oxide; an important group are derived from catechol.

Crown ethers strongly bind certain cations, forming complexes. The oxygen atoms are well situated to coordinate with a cation located at the interior of the ring, whereas the exterior of the ring is hydrophobic. The resulting cations often form salts that are soluble in nonpolar solvents, and for this reason crown ethers are useful in phase transfer catalysis. The denticity of the polyether influences the affinity of the crown ether for various cations. For example, 18-crown-6 has high affinity for the potassium cation, 15-crown-5 for the sodium cation, and 12-crown-4 for the lithium cation. The high affinity of 18-crown-6 for potassium ions contributes to its toxicity. The smallest crown ether still capable of binding cations is 8-crown-4, with the largest experimentally confirmed crown ether being 81-crown-27. Crown ethers are not the only macrocyclic ligands that have affinity for the potassium cation. Ionophores such as valinomycin also display a marked preference for the potassium cation over other cations.

Crown ethers have been shown to coordinate to Lewis acids through electrostatic, σ-hole (see halogen bond) interactions, between the Lewis basic oxygen atoms of the crown ether and the electrophilic Lewis acid center.

Structures of common crown ethers: 12-crown-4, 15-crown-5, 18-crown-6, dibenzo-18-crown-6, and an aza-crown ether

== History ==
In 1967, Charles Pedersen, who was a chemist working at DuPont, discovered a simple method of synthesizing a crown ether when he was trying to prepare a complexing agent for divalent cations. His strategy entailed linking two catecholate groups through one hydroxyl on each molecule. This linking defines a polydentate ligand that could partially envelop the cation and, by ionization of the phenolic hydroxyls, neutralize the bound dication. He was surprised to isolate a by-product that strongly complexed potassium cations. Citing earlier work on the dissolution of potassium in 16-crown-4, he realized that the cyclic polyethers represented a new class of complexing agents that were capable of binding alkali metal cations. He proceeded to report systematic studies of the synthesis and binding properties of crown ethers in a seminal series of papers. The fields of organic synthesis, phase transfer catalysts, and other emerging disciplines benefited from the discovery of crown ethers. Pedersen particularly popularized the dibenzo crown ethers.

Pedersen shared the 1987 Nobel Prize in Chemistry for the discovery of the synthetic routes to, and binding properties of, crown ethers.

== Affinity for cations ==
Due to the chelate effect and macrocyclic effect, crown ethers exhibit stronger affinities for diverse cations than their divided or acyclic analogs. Hereby, the cation selectivity for alkali metal ions is mainly dependent on the size and charge density of the ion and the cavity size of the crown ether.

Comparison of Cavity Size with Effective Ion Radii of Alkali Metals
Crown Ether	Cavity Size/Å	Favored Alkali Ion	Effective Ion Radius/Å
12-crown-4	0.6–0.75	Li^{+}	0.76
15-crown-5	0.86–0.92	Na^{+}	1.02
18-crown-6	1.34–1.55	K^{+}	1.38
21-crown-7	1.7–2.1	Cs^{+}	1.67

Affinities of a given crown ether towards the cations of lithium, sodium, and potassium can change by multiple magnitudes, which is attributed to the high differences in their charge density. Between the cations of potassium, rubidium, and cesium changes in affinities are less notable, as their charge density varies less than the alkali metals in earlier periods.

Apart from its high affinity for potassium cations, 18-crown-6 can also bind to protonated amines and form very stable complexes in both solution and the gas phase. Some amino acids, such as lysine, contain a primary amine on their side chains. Those protonated amino groups can bind to the cavity of 18-crown-6 and form stable complexes in the gas phase. Hydrogen-bonds are formed between the three hydrogen atoms of protonated amines and three oxygen atoms of 18-crown-6. These hydrogen-bonds make the complex a stable adduct. By incorporating luminescent substituents into their backbone, these compounds have proved to be sensitive ion probes, as changes in the absorption or fluorescence of the photoactive groups can be measured for very low concentrations of metal present. Some attractive examples include macrocycles, incorporating oxygen and/or nitrogen donors, that are attached to polyaromatic species such as anthracenes (via the 9 and/or 10 positions) or naphthalenes (via the 2 and 3 positions). Some modifications of dye ionophores by crown ethers exhibit extinction coefficients that are dependent on the chain lengths of chained cations.

== Pharmaceutical applications ==
Crown ethers have been investigated as excipients in pharmaceutical applications, demonstrating potential to improve the solubility of poorly soluble drugs and enhance their permeability across mucosal membranes. Evaluation of antibacterial activities of some thia crown ethers indicated that they can be considered as inhibitors for S. aureus methicillin resistance and P. aeruginosa. In addition, some of these compounds were screened for their antibacterial and antifungal activity on Klebsiella pneumoniae, Staphilococcus aureus, Pseudomonas aeruginosa and Candida albicans. Despite these promising properties, their broader application remains limited due to concerns over the toxicity associated with crown ethers.

== See also ==
- Aza-crown ether
- Thia-crown ether
- Cryptand
- Metallacrown
- Catenane
