= Williamson ether synthesis =

Method for preparing ethers

Williamson Ether Synthesis
Named after	Alexander William Williamson
Reaction type	Coupling reaction

Identifiers
Organic Chemistry Portal	williamson-synthesis
RSC ontology ID	RXNO:0000090

Ether synthesis by reaction of salicylaldehyde with chloroacetic acid and sodium hydroxide

The Williamson ether synthesis is an organic reaction, forming an ether from an organohalide and a deprotonated alcohol (alkoxide). This reaction was developed by Alexander Williamson in 1850. Typically it involves the reaction of an alkoxide ion with a primary alkyl halide via an S_{N}2 reaction. Versions of this reaction are also called O-alkylation.

The general reaction mechanism is as follows:

== Commercial examples ==
Bisphenol A diglycidyl ether ("BADGE"), an epoxy resin is produced commercially by the O-alkylation of bisphenol A with epichlorohydrin. The food additive carboxymethylcellulose is produced on an industrial scale by O-alkylation of cellulose with chloroacetic acid.

A simple example of a Williamson ether synthesis is the reaction of sodium ethoxide with chloroethane to form diethyl ether. Diethyl ether is produced industrially by dehydration of ethanol.

== Mechanism ==
The Williamson ether reaction follows an S_{N}2 (bimolecular nucleophilic substitution) mechanism. In order for the S_{N}2 reaction to take place there must be a good leaving group, commonly a halide. The leaving site must be a primary carbon, because secondary and tertiary leaving sites generally prefer to proceed as an elimination reaction. Also, this reaction does not favor the formation of bulky ethers like di-tertbutyl ether, due to predominant formation of alkenes instead.

== Scope ==
The Williamson reaction is of broad scope, is widely used in both laboratory and industrial synthesis, and remains popular method of preparing both symmetrical and asymmetrical ethers. The intramolecular reaction of halohydrins in particular, gives epoxides.

The alkoxide (or aryloxide) may be primary and secondary. Tertiary alkoxides tend to give elimination reactions. The alkylating agent, on the other hand is most preferably primary. Secondary alkylating agents also react, but tertiary halides are not of practical use. The leaving group is most often a halide or a sulfonate ester synthesized for the purpose of the reaction. Since the conditions of the reaction are rather forcing, protecting groups are often used to pacify other parts of the reacting molecules (e.g. other alcohols, amines, etc.)

The alkoxide reagent is often generated in situ by treating the alcohol or phenol with base followed by addition of the alkyl halide. Polar solvents, e.g., acetonitrile and N,N-dimethylformamide are commonly used. For undergraduate teaching laboratories, microwave-heating can be useful.

At temperatures near 300 °C, weaker alkylating agents can be employed. This approach has employed in the preparation of anisoles.

=== Variations ===
For less reactive alkylating agents (e.g. an alkyl chloride), the rate of reaction can be greatly improved by the addition of a catalytic quantity of a soluble iodide salt (which undergoes halide exchange with the chloride to yield a much more reactive iodide, a variant of the Finkelstein reaction). In extreme cases, silver compounds such as silver oxide may be added:

Finally, phase transfer catalysts are sometimes used (e.g. tetrabutylammonium bromide or 18-crown-6) in order to increase the solubility of the alkoxide by offering a softer counter-ion. One more example of etherification reaction in the tri-phasic system under phase transfer catalytic conditions is the reaction of benzyl chloride and furfuryl alcohol.

== Side reactions ==
The Williamson reaction often competes with the base-catalyzed elimination of the alkylating agent, and the nature of the leaving group as well as the reaction conditions (particularly the temperature and solvent) can have a strong effect on which is favored. In particular, some structures of alkylating agent can be particularly prone to elimination.

When the nucleophile is an aryloxide ion, the Williamson reaction can also compete with alkylation on the ring since the aryloxide is an ambident nucleophile.

== See also ==
- Ullmann condensation for the formation of bis-aryl ethers
- Dimethyl sulfate and Diethyl sulfate, relatively inexpensive organosulfates used in alternative ether synthesis methods
