= 18-Crown-6 =

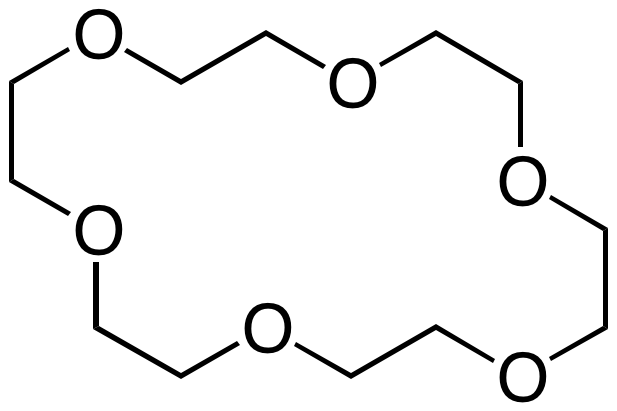
- Skeletal formula

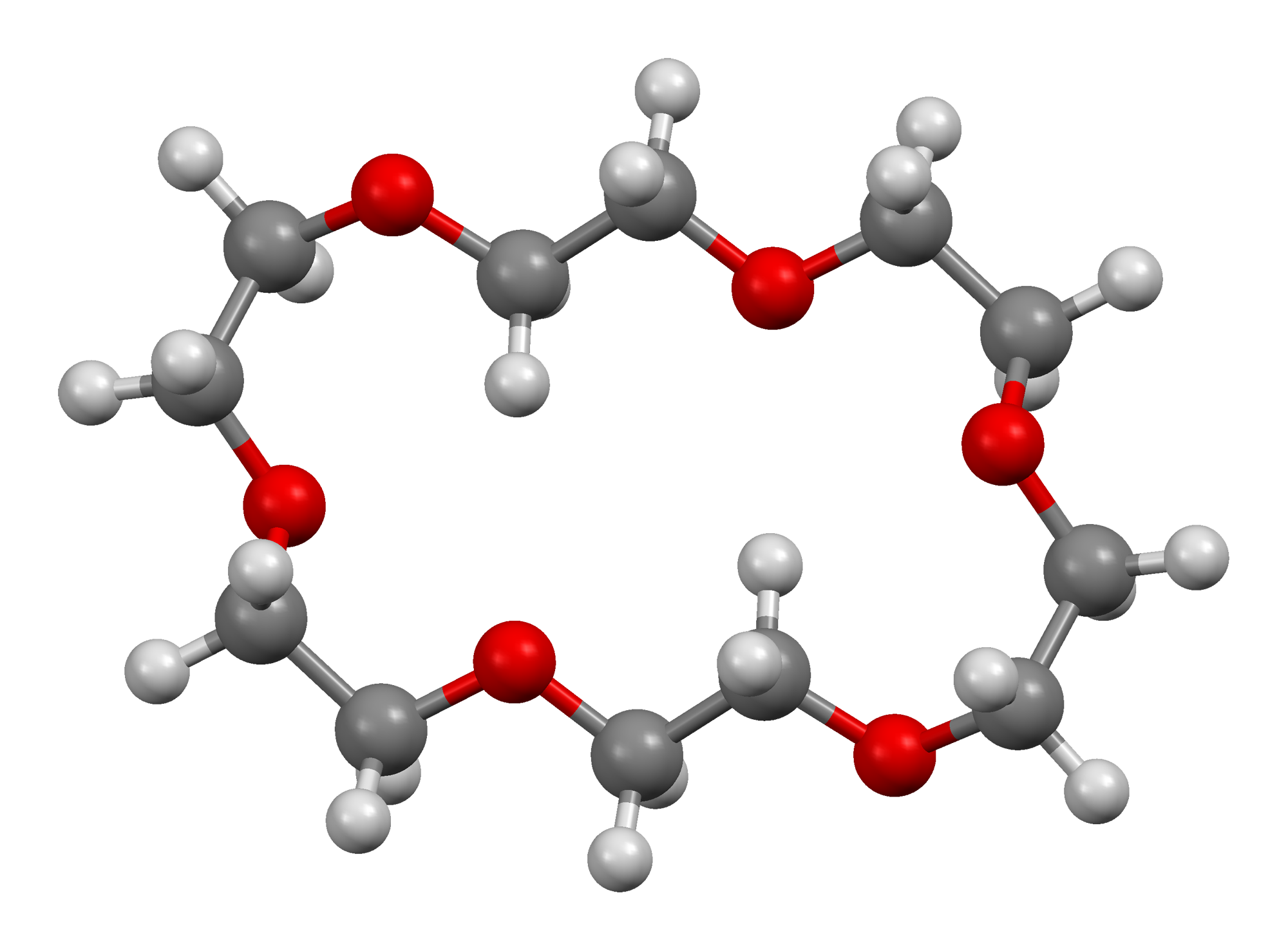
- Ball-and-stick model

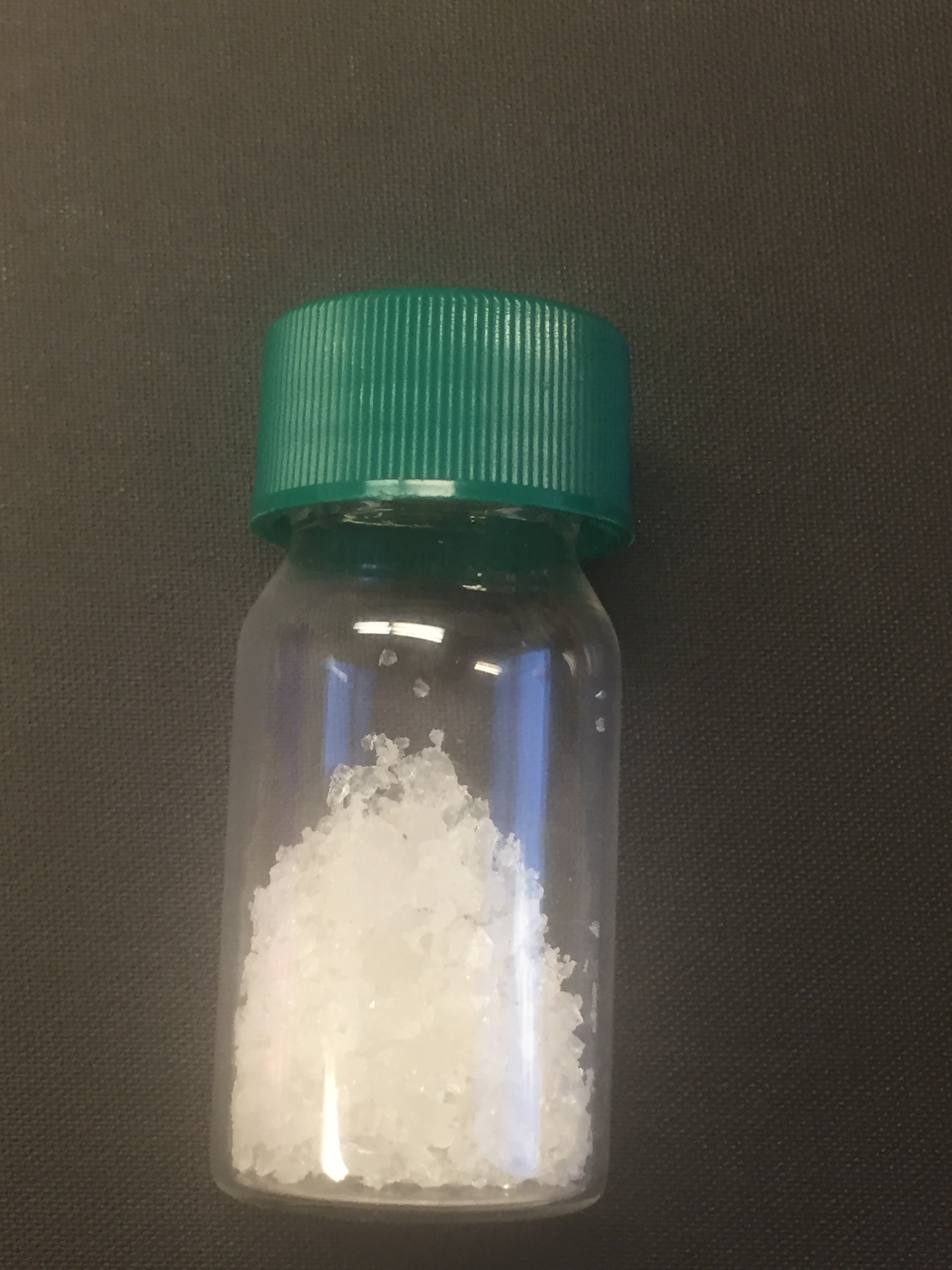
- sample

Names
- Preferred IUPAC name 1,4,7,10,13,16-Hexaoxacyclooctadecane

Identifiers
CAS Number	17455-13-9
3D model (JSmol)	Interactive image; Interactive image
Beilstein Reference	1619616
ChEBI	CHEBI:32397
ChEMBL	ChEMBL155204
ChemSpider	26563
ECHA InfoCard	100.037.687
EC Number	241-473-5
Gmelin Reference	4535
PubChem CID	28557
UNII	63J177NC5B
CompTox Dashboard (EPA)	DTXSID7058626
- InChI: InChI=1S/C12H24O6/c1-2-14-5-6-16-9-10-18-12-11-17-8-7-15-4-3-13-1/h1-12H2 Key: XEZNGIUYQVAUSS-UHFFFAOYSA-N; InChI=1/C12H24O6/c1-2-14-5-6-16-9-10-18-12-11-17-8-7-15-4-3-13-1/h1-12H2 Key: XEZNGIUYQVAUSS-UHFFFAOYAP
- SMILES: O1CCOCCOCCOCCOCCOCC1; C1COCCOCCOCCOCCOCCO1

Properties
Chemical formula	C_{12}H_{24}O_{6}
Molar mass	264.315 g/mol
Density	1.237 g/cm^{3}
Melting point	37 to 40 °C (99 to 104 °F; 310 to 313 K)
Boiling point	116 °C (241 °F; 389 K) (0.2 Torr)
Solubility in water	75 g/L

Hazards
- GHS labelling
Pictograms	(GHS07: Exclamation mark)
Signal word	Warning
Hazard statements	H302, H315, H319, H335
Precautionary statements	P261, P264, P270, P271, P280, P301+P312, P302+P352, P304+P340, P305+P351+P338, P312, P321, P330, P332+P313, P337+P313, P362, P403+P233, P405, P501

Related compounds
Related compounds	Dibenzo-18-crown-6; Triglyme; Hexaaza-18-crown-6
- Except where otherwise noted, data are given for materials in their standard state (at 25 °C [77 °F], 100 kPa). verify (what is ?) Infobox references

18-Crown-6 is an organic compound with the formula [C_{2}H_{4}O]_{6} and the IUPAC name of 1,4,7,10,13,16-hexaoxacyclooctadecane. It is a white, hygroscopic crystalline solid with a low melting point. Like other crown ethers, 18-crown-6 functions as a ligand for some metal cations with a particular affinity for potassium cations (binding constant in methanol: 10^{6} M^{−1}). The point group of 18-crown-6 is S_{6}. The dipole moment of 18-crown-6 is solvent- and temperature-dependent. Below 25 °C, the dipole moment of 18-crown-6 is 2.76 ± 0.06 D in cyclohexane and 2.73 ± 0.02 in benzene. The synthesis of the crown ethers led to the awarding of the Nobel Prize in Chemistry to Charles J. Pedersen.

== Synthesis ==
This compound is prepared by a modified Williamson ether synthesis in the presence of a templating cation:

(CH_{2}OCH_{2}CH_{2}Cl)_{2} + (CH_{2}OCH_{2}CH_{2}OH)_{2} + 2 KOH → (CH_{2}CH_{2}O)_{6} + 2 KCl + 2 H_{2}O

It can be also prepared by the oligomerization of ethylene oxide. It can be purified by distillation, where its tendency to supercool becomes evident. 18-Crown-6 can also be purified by recrystallisation from hot acetonitrile. It initially forms an insoluble solvate. Rigorously dry material can be made by dissolving the compound in THF followed by the addition of NaK to give [K(18-crown-6)]Na, an alkalide salt.

Crystallographic analysis reveals a relatively flat molecule but one where the oxygen centres are not oriented in the idealized 6-fold symmetric geometry usually shown. The molecule undergoes significant conformational change upon complexation.

== Reactions ==
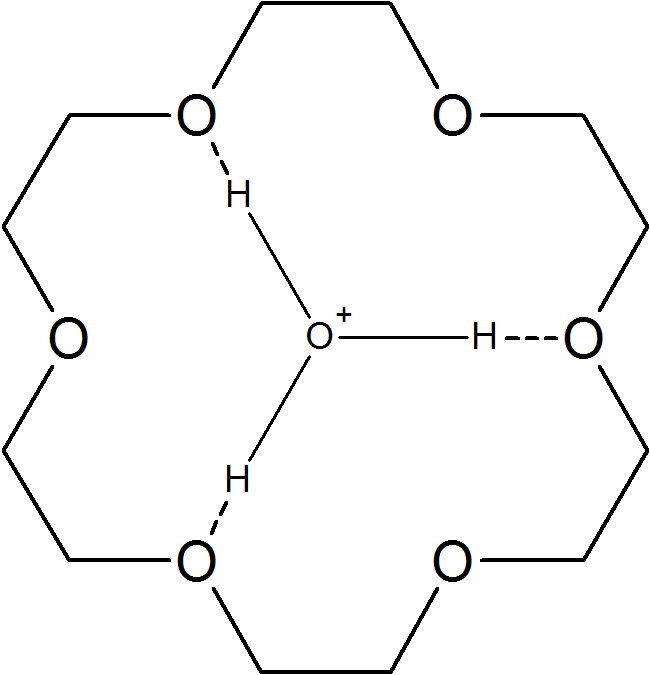
The complex of H_{3}O^{+} with 18-crown-6

18-Crown-6 has a high affinity for the hydronium ion H_{3}O^{+}, as it can fit inside the crown ether. Thus, reaction of 18-crown-6 with strong acids gives the cation [H_{3}O·18-crown-6]^{+}. For example, interaction of 18-crown-6 with HCl gas in toluene with a little moisture gives an ionic liquid layer with the composition [H_{3}O·18-crown-6]^{+}[HCl_{2}]^{−}·3.8C_{6}H_{5}Me, from which the solid [H_{3}O·18-crown-6]^{+}[HCl_{2}]^{−} can be isolated on standing. Reaction of the ionic liquid layer with two molar equivalents of water gives the crystalline product (H_{5}O_{2})[H_{3}O·18-crown-6]Cl_{2}.

== Applications ==
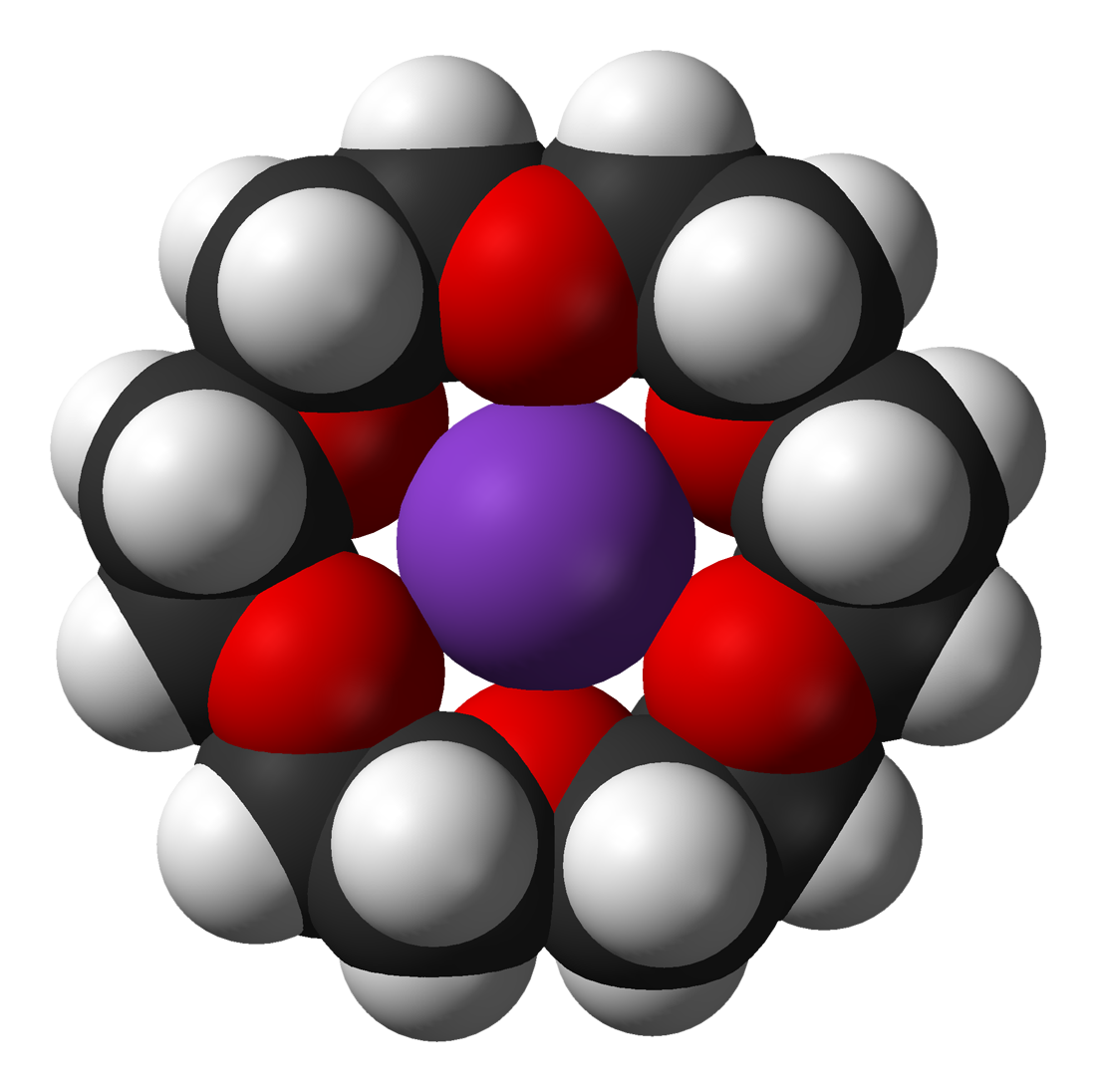
18-crown-6 complex with potassium ion

18-Crown-6 binds to a variety of small cations, using all six oxygens as donor atoms. Crown ethers can be used in the laboratory as phase transfer catalysts. Salts which are normally insoluble in organic solvents are made soluble by crown ether. For example, potassium permanganate dissolves in benzene in the presence of 18-crown-6, giving the so-called "purple benzene", which can be used to oxidize diverse organic compounds.

Various substitution reactions are also accelerated in the presence of 18-crown-6, which suppresses ion-pairing. The anions thereby become naked nucleophiles. For example, using 18-crown-6, potassium acetate is a more powerful nucleophile in organic solvents:

[K·(18-crown-6)]^{+}AcO^{−} + C_{6}H_{5}CH_{2}Cl → C_{6}H_{5}CH_{2}OAc + [K·(18-crown-6)]^{+}Cl^{−}

The first electride salt to be examined with X-ray crystallography, [Cs(18-crown-6)_{2}]^{+}·e^{−}, was synthesized in 1983. This highly air- and moisture-sensitive solid has a sandwich molecular structure, where the electron is trapped within nearly spherical lattice cavities. However, the shortest electron-electron distance is too long (8.68 Å) to make this material a conductor of electricity.
