= Michael Pope =

Michael Pope may refer to:

- Michael Pope (filmmaker), American filmmaker
- Michael Pope (producer), Australian television presenter and producer
- Michael Pope (athlete), British hurdler
- Michael T. Pope, chemist
