= CEF3 =

CEF3 or CeF3 could signify:

- Bow Island Airport, an airport with the identifier code of CEF3
- Cerium(III) fluoride, a compound with the chemical formula of CeF_{3}
