= Ion-selective electrode =

Sensor of ion concentration in a solution

An ion-selective electrode (ISE), also known as a specific ion electrode (SIE), is a simple membrane-based potentiometric device which measures the activity of ions in solution. It is a transducer (or sensor) that converts the change in the concentration of a specific ion dissolved in a solution into an electrical potential. ISE is a type of sensor device that senses changes in signal based on the surrounding environment through time. This device will have an input signal, a property that we wish to quantify, and an output signal, a quantity we can register. In this case, ion selective electrode are electrochemical sensors that give potentiometric signals. The voltage is theoretically dependent on the logarithm of the ionic activity, according to the Nernst equation. Analysis with ISEs expands throughout a range of technological fields such as biology, chemistry, environmental science and other industrial workplaces like agriculture. Ion-selective electrodes are used in analytical chemistry and biochemical/biophysical research, where measurements of ionic concentration in an aqueous solution are required.

== General theory of ion-selective electrodes ==
When using ion-selective electrodes, a scientist wants to compare the signal of an analyte to the electrochemical potential shown by the ISE. Different types of electrodes can be used to do this, as described in the sections below. As shown in the general schematic, an ion-selective membrane (consisting of glass, crystalline, liquid, or polymers) selectively allows specific types of ions to travel through, or in other words, is selectively permeable.

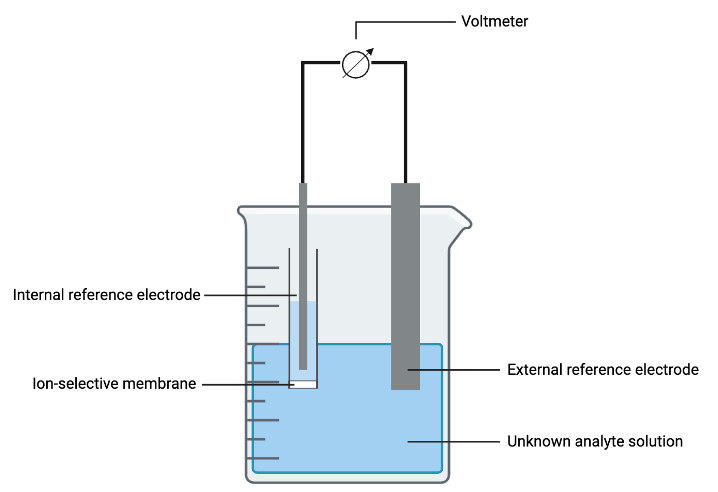
General set-up of ion-selective electrode highlighting the internal and external reference electrodes, voltmeter, and analyte solution.

All ISE measurements are made with a comparison to an internal reference electrode with a known concentration of the analyte being measured. The external reference electrode is the part of the system that is exposed to the solution. The potential is measured using the following formula:

$E_{cell} = E_{ise} - E_{ref}$

E_{ise} includes the potential of the internal reference electrode and the ion-selective membrane potential, E_{m}. The E_{ise} is governed by analyte activity in the internal solution whereas E_{m} is governed by the activity of the analyte on each side of the selective membrane. Furthermore, the E_{ref} or external reference portion of the cell is dependent on the half-reaction of the electrode and the liquid junction potential E_{j}.

== Reference electrodes ==
The most common types of reference electrodes used in analytical chemistry include the standard hydrogen electrode, the saturated calomel electrode, and the silver chloride electrode.

The standard hydrogen electrode (SHE) is the primary reference electrode that has a potential of 0 volts at all temperatures and a pressure of 1 atm. The figure on the left highlights the platinum (Pt) wire electrode which is not a part of the reaction (it’s a catalyst) and can serve as either the anode or cathode. The wire is immersed in an acidic solution with an H2 (g) outlet pumping gaseous hydrogen into the solution. On the surface of the Pt electrode, a half-reaction occurs:

$\ce{2H^+{}_{(aq)} + 2e^- <=> H_2{}_{(g)}}$

The cell notation is as follows with a single line denoting a phase boundary and a double line representing a salt bridge: $\ce{Pt | H_2 (1 atm) | H^+(1M) ||}$

In fieldwork, the SHE is inconvenient, making the Saturated Calomel Electrode (SCE) the second most used reference. However, it contains mercury, making it the less preferred choice of measurement. The electrode, as shown on the right, is connected to an electrical lead. A platinum wire in a paste of Hg/Hg_{2}Cl_{2} is placed in a saturated 3M KCl solution. A small hole of asbestos wire is located on the bottom of the internal electrode. A ceramic frit, acting as the salt bridge, is located on the bottom of the reference electrode. The overall half-reaction is:

$\ce{Hg2Cl2 + 2e^- <-> 2Hg + 2Cl^-}$

The notation for the cell is: $\ce{Hg | Hg2Cl2 | KCl(xM) ||}$

Given its toxicity, the silver chloride electrode is most frequently used even over the SCE. Within the reference electrode, an Ag/AgCl wire is immersed in a KCl-filling solution. A frit at the bottom of the reference electrode plays the role of a salt bridge. The overall half-reaction is:

$\ce{AgCl + e^-<=> Ag +Cl^-}$

The notation for the cell is: $\ce{Ag | AgCl | KCl(xM)||}$

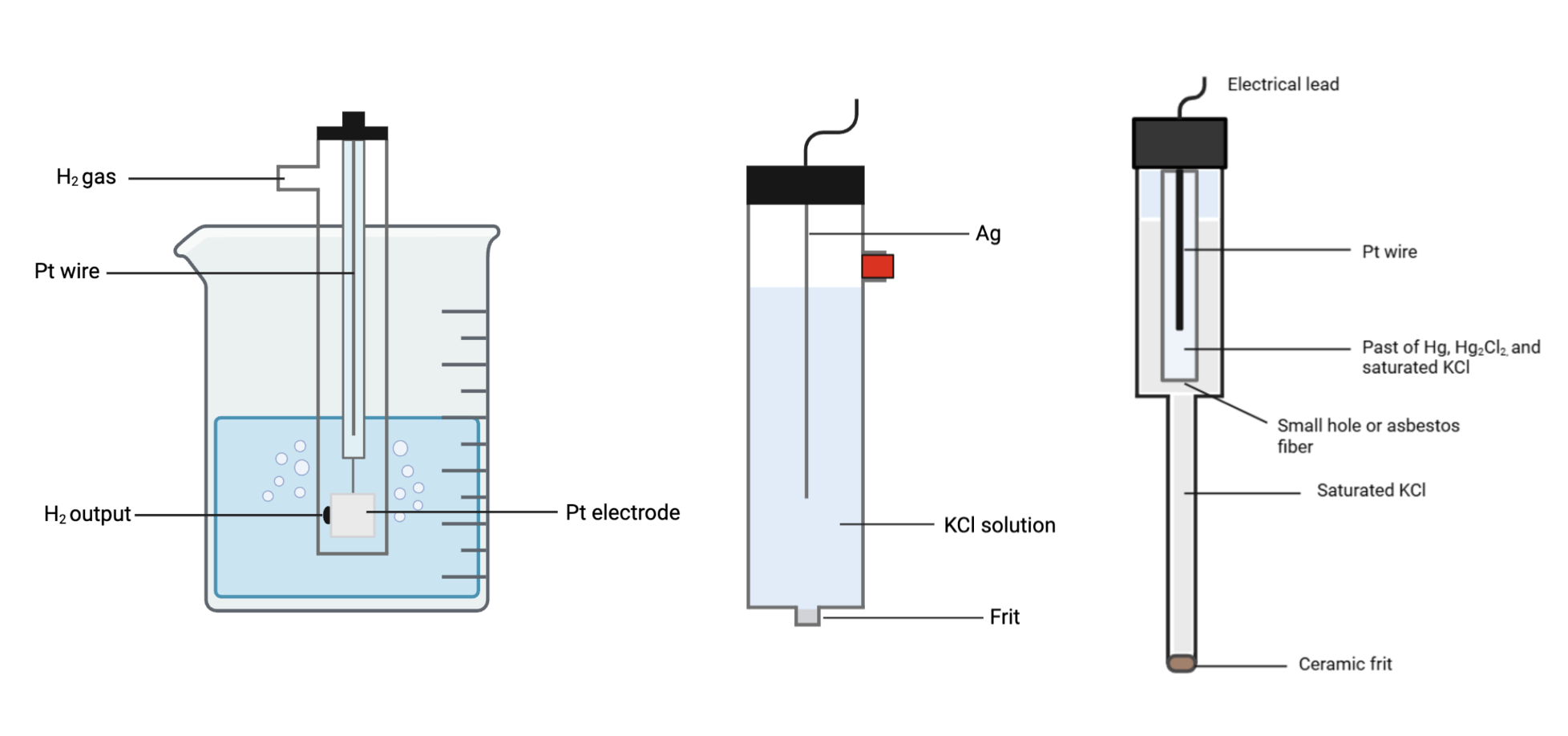
Common reference electrodes for ion-selective electrode systems: Standard Hydrogen Electrode (left), Ag/AgCl Reference Electrode (middle), and Standard Calomel Electrode (right).

== Types of ion-selective membrane ==
There are four main types of ion-selective membrane used in ion-selective electrodes (ISEs): glass, solid state, liquid based, and compound electrode.

=== Glass membranes ===
Glass membranes are made from an ion-exchange (absorption of ions of interest occurs, if it were simple ion exchange no charge would be generated) type of glass (silicate or chalcogenide). This type of ISE has good selectivity, but only for several single-charged cations; mainly H^{+}, Na^{+}, and Ag^{+}. Chalcogenide glass also has selectivity for double-charged metal ions, such as Pb^{2+}, and Cd^{2+}. The glass membrane has excellent chemical durability and can work in very aggressive media. A very common example of this type of electrode is the pH glass electrode.

=== Crystalline membranes ===
Crystalline membranes are made from mono- or polycrystallites of a single substance. They have good selectivity, because only ions which can introduce themselves into the crystal structure can interfere with the electrode response. This is the major difference between this type of electrodes and the glass membrane electrodes. The lack of internal solution reduces the potential junctions. Selectivity of crystalline membranes can be for both cation and anion of the membrane-forming substance. An example is the fluoride selective electrode based on LaF_{3} crystals.

=== Ion-exchange resin membranes ===
Ion-exchange resins are based on special organic polymer membranes which contain a specific ion-exchange substance (resin). This is the most widespread type of ion-specific electrode. Usage of specific resins allows preparation of selective electrodes for tens of different ions, both single-atom or multi-atom. They are also the most widespread electrodes with anionic selectivity. However, such electrodes have low chemical and physical durability as well as "survival time". An example is the potassium selective electrode, based on valinomycin as an ion-exchange agent.

=== Enzyme electrodes ===
Enzyme electrodes are not true ion-selective electrodes, but are usually considered to be within the ion-selective electrode scope. Such an electrode has a "double reaction" mechanism - an enzyme reacts with a specific substance, and the product of this reaction (usually H^{+} or OH^{−}) is detected by a true ion-selective electrode, such as a pH-selective electrodes. All these reactions occur inside a special membrane, which covers the true ion-selective electrode. This is why enzyme electrodes are sometimes considered ion-selective. An example is a glucose selective electrode.

== Construction ==
These (modified, based on original 1970 technology) electrodes are prepared from glass capillary tubing approximately 2 millimeters in diameter, a large batch at a time. Polyvinyl chloride is dissolved in a solvent and plasticizers (typically phthalates) added, in the standard fashion used when making something out of vinyl. In order to provide the ionic specificity, a specific ion channel or carrier is added to the solution; this allows the ion to pass through the vinyl, which prevents the passage of other ions and water.

One end of a piece of capillary tubing about an inch or two long is dipped into this solution and removed to let the vinyl solidify into a plug at that end of the tube. Using a syringe and needle, the tube is filled with salt solution from the other end, and may be stored in a bath of the salt solution for an indeterminate period. For convenience in use, the open end of the tubing is fitted through a tight o-ring into a somewhat larger diameter tubing containing the same salt solution, with a silver or platinum electrode wire inserted. New electrode tips can thus be changed very quickly by simply removing the older electrode and replacing it with a new one.

== Applications ==
In use, the electrode wire is connected to one terminal of a galvanometer or pH meter, the other terminal of which is connected to a reference electrode, and both electrodes are immersed in the solution to be tested. The passage of the ion through the vinyl via the carrier or channel creates an electric current, which registers on the galvanometer; by calibrating against standard solutions of varying concentration, the ionic concentration in the tested solution can be estimated from the galvanometer reading.

In practice there are several issues which affect this measurement, and different electrodes from the same batch will differ in their properties. Leakage between the vinyl and the wall of the capillary, thereby allowing passage of any ions, will cause the meter reading to show little or no change between the various calibration solutions, and requires that the electrode be discarded. Similarly, with use the ion-sensitive channels in the vinyl appear to gradually become blocked or otherwise inactivated, causing the electrode to lose sensitivity. The response of the electrode and galvanometer is temperature sensitive, and also 'drifts' over time, requiring recalibration frequently during a series of measurements, ideally at least one calibration sample before and after each test sample. On the other hand, after immersion in the solution there is a 'settling time' which can be five minutes or even longer, before the electrode and galvanometer equilibrate to a new reading; so that timing of the reading is critical in order to find the most accurate 'window' after the response has settled, but before it has drifted appreciably.

== Interferences ==
The most serious problem limiting use of ion-selective electrodes is interference from other, undesired, ions. No ion-selective electrodes are completely ion-specific; all are sensitive to other ions having similar physical properties, to an extent which depends on the degree of similarity. Most of these interferences are weak enough to be ignored, but in some cases the electrode may actually be much more sensitive to the interfering ion than to the desired ion, requiring that the interfering ion be present only in relatively very low concentrations, or entirely absent. In practice, the relative sensitivities of each type of ion-specific electrode to various interfering ions is generally known and should be checked for each case; however the precise degree of interference depends on many factors, preventing precise correction of readings. Instead, the calculation of relative degree of interference from the concentration of interfering ions can only be used as a guide to determine whether the approximate extent of the interference will allow reliable measurements, or whether the experiment will need to be redesigned so as to reduce the effect of interfering ions. The nitrate electrode has various ionic interferences, i.e. perchlorate, iodide, chloride, and sulfate. These interferences vary markedly in the extent to which they interfere. Thus, perchlorate gives a response which is about 50,000x as great as an equal amount of nitrate, while 1000x as much sulfate produces about a 10% error in the reading. Chloride causes a 10% error when present at about 30x the nitrate level, but can be removed by the addition of silver sulfate. Alternatively, nitrate can be determined by using an ammonia gas sensing electrode. This technique allows the user to determine both ammonium and nitrate ions sequentially. The procedure makes use of the reducing ability of titanium chloride. Trivalent titanium reduces any nitrate ion, up to 20 ppm, to ammonium ion (i.e., reverse nitrification). At pH 12-13, any ammonium ion in the sample is converted to ammonia gas and is ultimately detected by the electrode.

== Alkali metal ISE ==
Valinomycin

Electrodes specific for each alkali metal ion, Li^{+}, Na^{+}, K^{+}, Rb^{+} and Cs^{+} have been developed. The principle on which these electrodes are based is that the alkali metal ion is encapsulated in a molecular cavity whose size is matched to the size of the ion. For example, an electrode based on Valinomycin may be used for the determination of potassium ion concentration.

== See also ==
- Fluoride selective electrode
- Ion transport number
- Solvated electron
- Electrochemical hydrogen compressor
