= Streptomyces cyaneofuscatus =

Scientific classification
- Domain: Bacteria
- Kingdom: Bacillati
- Phylum: Actinomycetota
- Class: Actinomycetes
- Order: Streptomycetales
- Family: Streptomycetaceae
- Genus: Streptomyces
- Species: S. cyaneofuscatus

Binomial name
- Streptomyces cyaneofuscatus (Kudrina 1957) Pridham et al. 1958 (Approved Lists 1980)

Type strain
- AS 4.1612, ATCC 19746, ATCC 23619, BCRC 11467, CBS 112.60, CBS 485.68, CCRC 11467, CGMCC 4.1612, DSM 40148, ETH 24190, IFO 13190, IMET 41583, INA 99/54, ISP 5148, JCM 4364, KCC S-0364, KCCS-0364, NBRC 13190, NCIMB 13021, NRRL B-2570, NRRL-ISP 5148, RIA 1027, UNIQEM 133, VKM Ac-752, VTT E-072752

Synonyms
- "Actinomyces cyaneofuscatus" Kudrina 1957; Streptomyces cavourensis subsp. washingtonensis Skarbek and Brady 1978 (Approved Lists 1980)

Species of bacterium

Streptomyces cyaneofuscatus is a bacterium species from the genus of Streptomyces which has been isolated from soil in Daghestan in Russia. Streptomyces cyaneofuscatus can be used for valinomycin biosynthesis.

== See also ==
- List of Streptomyces species
