= Bob Williams (chemist) =

English chemist (1926–2015)

Bob Williams MBE FRS
- Born: 25 February 1926; Wallasey, Cheshire, England
- Died: 21 March 2015 (aged 89); Oxford, England
- Education: University of Oxford
- Known for: Irving–Williams series
- Spouse: Jelly Büchli (m. 1952)
- Awards: Royal Medal
- Scientific career
- Fields: Chemistry; Metalloenzymes
- Workplaces: University of Oxford
- Thesis: An investigation of the complex compounds of some metals (1950)
- Doctoral advisor: Harry Irving
- Doctoral students: Peter Day; Carole Perry; Michael Thor Pope; Tony Orchard; Chris Dobson; Rachel E. Klevit; Stephen Mann

Robert Joseph Paton Williams (25 February 1926 – 21 March 2015) was an English chemist, an Emeritus Fellow at Wadham College, Oxford and an Emeritus Professor at the University of Oxford.

== Education and early life ==
Robert Joseph Paton Williams was born on 25 February 1926 in Wallasey to Ernest Ivor Williams, a customs and excise officer at Liverpool, and Alice Williams (née Roberts), a milliner; he was the second of four children.

Williams failed to gain a scholarship to Wallasey Grammar School, having missed six months’ schooling with diphtheria, but his parents paid for him to attend. He went on to gain a place and be awarded a Postmastership to read chemistry at Merton College, Oxford in 1944. For his final undergraduate research year he worked with analytical chemist Harry Irving. This enabled him to establish an order of the relative stabilities of metal–organic complexes along the latter half of the transition series manganese through zinc. From these findings he saw a parallel with the selective uptake of metal ions by organisms.

Williams’s plan was to continue working with Irving for his DPhil, but he first visited the lab of Arne Tiselius at Uppsala University. He was impressed by what he saw there, and returned to Sweden after he gained his DPhil in 1950. During the longer stay he worked on protein purification and devised a method called gradient elution analysis.

== Career and research ==
Williams then spent another period back at Merton, having won a junior research fellowship, Then, “out of the blue, in 1954, Cyril Hinshelwood, then Oxford Professor of Chemistry, asked to see Bob.” He was told that three colleges—Christ Church, Pembroke and Wadham—needed a tutor in chemistry. “Each one will invite you to dine. Come back again in two weeks to give me your decision.” Williams joined Wadham College, Oxford in 1955 and remained there for the rest of his life. His doctoral students include Peter Day, Carole Perry and Michael Thor Pope.

William's work in pure inorganic chemistry led to a two-volume textbook of inorganic chemistry, written with Courtenay Phillips, He became increasingly interested in enzyme catalysis, and in particular the role of metal ions, as for example the role of copper in proteins. He and Bert Vallee proposed of the concept of the entatic state whereby atoms and groups in enzyme active sites are maintained by binding to the apoenzyme in positions and states appropriate to catalyse reactions.

In the first paper ever published in the Journal of Theoretical Biology Williams argued that spatial separation of the H^{+} and OH^{–} ions produced in the conversion of ATP to ADP would be necessary for the catalysis. In the same year Peter Mitchell proposed a similar idea in the form of the chemiosmotic hypothesis. In a special issue of the Journal of Theoretical Biology in celebration of 50 years of its existence Williams described the correspondence between Mitchell and himself.

Williams contributed to understanding of the distribution of the chemical elements in living organisms and in collaborationwith João J. R. Fraústo da Silva he wrote three books in this area, as well as a book with Rosalind Rickaby on geological aspects of life.

Williams retired in 1991 and devoted much of his retirement to the writing of the books mentioned.

=== Awards and honours ===
Williams was appointed Member of the Order of the British Empire (MBE) in the 2010 New Year Honours for services to the community in North Oxford.

He was elected a Fellow of the Royal Society (FRS) in 1972 and was a Foreign Member of the Swedish, Portuguese, Czechoslovak and Belgian science academies. He was a medallist of the Biochemical Society (twice), the Royal Society (twice), the Royal Society of Chemistry (three times), the Federation of European Biochemical Societies (twice) and the International Union of Biochemistry. He delivered the Bakerian Lecture in 1981 and won the Royal Medal in 1995.

== Personal life ==
While he was in Uppsala Williams met Jelly Klara Büchli, a Dutch student from Groningen. They married in 1952 and then lived in Oxford. Jelly read English language and literature at St Hilda's College, Oxford between 1952 and 1955, but the birth of their first son, Timothy Ivor, interrupted her final exams. A second son, John M, was born in 1957. In 1981 Jelly published A Dutch Reader.

Bob Williams died in the John Radcliffe Hospital on 21 March 2015.
