= Stability constant =

Stability constant may refer to:

- Equilibrium constant
- Acid dissociation constant
- Stability constants of complexes
