= João J. R. Fraústo da Silva =

Portuguese academic and chemist

João J. R. Fraústo da Silva (Tomar, August 30, 1933 – June 10, 2022) was a Portuguese chemist.

Fraústo da Silva received his degree in industrial chemical engineering from the Instituto Superior Técnico in 1958 and his D.Phil. in chemistry working with Harry Irving (chemist) at the University of Oxford in 1962. He held several positions throughout his career, which features:

- Director of the Instituto Superior Técnico of the Technical University of Lisbon;
- President's Office of Research and Planning of Educational Action (GEPAE) of the Ministry of Education;
- First Rector of the Universidade Nova de Lisboa;
- Minister of Education and Universities in the VIII Constitutional Government of Portugal;
- President of the National Institute of Public Administration;
- President of the Foundation Cultural Centre of Belém;
- Chairman of the Board of Trustees of the Foundation Oriente.
