= Ulrich Kortz =

German chemist

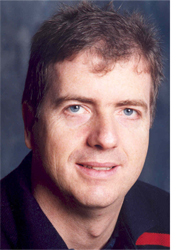
- Kortz in Bremen
- Born: 8 June 1963
- Died: 23 September 2026 (aged 63)
- Education: Georgetown University
- Known for: structural inorganic chemistry, polyoxometalate chemistry
- Awards: Harold N. Glassman award; Alfred Kastler postdoctoral fellowship;
- Scientific career
- Fields: Chemistry
- Workplaces: American University of Beirut, Constructor University
- Doctoral advisor: Michael Thor Pope

Ulrich "Uli" Kortz was a German chemist and professor, working in the area of synthetic polyoxometalate chemistry.

== Biography ==
Ulrich Kortz obtained his education in Chemical Engineering in the period 1982–1989 and was awarded his Diplom from Darmstadt University of Applied Sciences. In the period of 1989–1995 he was working on his doctorate degree at Georgetown University in Washington, DC, under close supervision of Michael T. Pope. He spent his postdoctoral years with Dante Gatteschi at Florence University, Italy, from 1995 to 1996, and with Andre Tézé and Gilbert Hervé at Versailles University, France, from 1996 to 1997. In 1997 he was hired as assistant professor at the American University of Beirut in Lebanon, and he was promoted to associate professor in 2001. In 2002 he returned to Germany to join the newly established International University Bremen, now Constructor University, as associate professor and he was promoted to full professor in 2007.

== Highlights ==
The Kortz group ("The POM Lab") discovered the class of polyoxopalladates(II) in 2008 with the synthesis of {Pd13As8}, and the class of polyoxoaurates(III) in 2010 with the synthesis of {Au4As4}. Ever since they have systematically developed the field of polyoxo-noble-metalates further. They also pioneered the chemistry of the wheel-shaped {P8W48} by preparing {Cu20P8W48}, which contains a highly symmetrical Cu20 core with copper(II) ions in three different coordination geometries, and another highlight example was {Fe16P8W48}. Kortz and his team also discovered the dilacunary heteropolytungstate {GeW10} in 2006, and systematically explored its reactivity towards transition metal ions. They explored the reactivity of many other lacunary heteropolytungstates with d and f block metal ions, two highlight products being {Mn19Si6W60} and {Ce20Ge10W100}. The Kortz group also reported on POMs with interesting magnetic properties. In the area of catalysis, they reported mainly on olefin epoxidation, alkane/alkene oxidation, as well as oxidative and reductive water splitting. Finally, the group researched the biological properties of POMs.
