= Fluocerite =

Halite mineral

Fluocerite-(La)

General
- Category: Minerals
- Formula: (La,Ce)F3
- Strunz classification: 03.AC.15 (03)
- Dana classification: 09.03.04.02 (09)
- Crystal system: Trigonal
- Crystal class: Hexagonal scalenohedral
- Space group: P3̅c1 (No. 165)
- Unit cell: 328.80 Å³ (Calculated from Unit Cell)

Identification
- Formula mass: 196.02
- Colour: Greenish-yellow
- Crystal habit: Platy, tabular
- Cleavage: Indistinct, Imperfect
- Mohs scale hardness: 4-5
- Luster: Vitreous
- Streak: White
- Diaphaneity: Transparent to translucent
- Density: 5.93
- Birefringence: 0.006

Fluocerite-(Ce)

General
- Category: Minerals
- Formula: (La,Ce)F3
- Strunz classification: 3/A.10-20
- Dana classification: 9.3.4.1
- Crystal system: Trigonal
- Crystal class: Hexagonal Scalenohedral
- Unit cell: 320.86 Å³ (Calculated from Unit Cell)

Identification
- Formula mass: 196.99
- Colour: Light yellow; darkening to yellow- and red-brown; colourless to pale pink (transmitted light)
- Crystal habit: Massive, Primsatic
- Cleavage: Distinct/Good
- Fracture: Irregular/Uneven, Splintery, Sub-Conchoidal
- Tenacity: Brittle
- Mohs scale hardness: 4.5-5
- Luster: Vitreous, Resinous, Pearly
- Streak: Yellow-white
- Diaphaneity: Transparent to translucent
- Specific gravity: 5.93 - 6.14
- Density: 5.93 - 6.14 g/cm3 (Measured)
- Birefringence: 0.005 - 0.007

Fluocerite, also known as tysonite, is a mineral consisting of cerium and lanthanum fluorides, with the chemical formula (Ce,La)F_{3}. The end members are classified as two different mineral types depending on the cation, fluocerite-(Ce) and fluocerite-(La), corresponding respectively to lanthanum trifluoride and cerium trifluoride. Both crystallize in the trigonal system.

Fluocerite-(Ce) was first described (without the Ce) in 1845 from hydrothermal veins in granite in Sweden. Fluocerite-(La) was first described in 1969 from the type locality in central Kazakhstan. The name tysonite was given in 1880 to the same type of mineral found in Colorado. Tysonite-type structure is used for rare-earth fluorides with the P3c1 space group structure.
