= Streptomyces microflavus =

Scientific classification
- Domain: Bacteria
- Kingdom: Bacillati
- Phylum: Actinomycetota
- Class: Actinomycetes
- Order: Streptomycetales
- Family: Streptomycetaceae
- Genus: Streptomyces
- Species: S. microflavus

Binomial name
- Streptomyces microflavus Waksman and Henrici 1948

Type strain
- AS 4.1428, ATCC 13231, ATCC 25474, ATCC B-2888, BCRC 12084, CBS .884.69, CBS 124.18, CBS 884.69, CBS Krainsky, CCRC 12084, CGMCC 4.1428, DSM 40331, ETH 10206, ETH 31561, ETH 31582, HAMBI 1019, IFO 13062, IMRU 3332, IMSNU 21062, INA 3332, ISP 5331, JCM 4496, KCC S-0496, KCTC 19055, Lanoot R-8689, LMG 19327, NBRC 13062, NRRL B-2156, NRRL B-2888, NRRL B-B-2888, NRRL-ISP 5331, PSA 122, R-8689, RIA 1254, VKM Ac-971, VTT E-011975

Synonyms
- "Actinomyces alboviridis" Duché 1934; "Actinomyces cretaceus" (Kruger 1905) Krasil'nikov 1941; "Actinomyces fulvissimus" Jensen 1930; "Actinomyces griseus subsp. alpha" Ciferri 1927; "Actinomyces lipmanii" Waksman and Curtis 1916; "Actinomyces microflavus" Krainsky 1914; "Actinomyces willmorei" Erikson 1935; Streptomyces alboviridis (Duché 1934) Pridham et al. 1958 (Approved Lists 1980); Streptomyces fulvissimus (Jensen 1930) Waksman and Henrici 1948 (Approved Lists 1980); Streptomyces griseus subsp. alpha (Ciferri 1927) Pridham 1970 (Approved Lists 1980); Streptomyces griseus subsp. cretosus Pridham 1970 (Approved Lists 1980); Streptomyces lipmanii (Waksman and Curtis 1916) Waksman and Henrici 1948 (Approved Lists 1980); Streptomyces luridiscabiei Park et al. 2003; Streptomyces willmorei (Erikson 1935) Waksman and Henrici 1948 (Approved Lists 1980)

Species of bacterium

Streptomyces microflavus is a bacterium species from the genus of Streptomyces which has been isolated from soil. Streptomyces microflavus produces nemadectin, fattiviracin A1, milbemycin and deoxyuridines. Streptomyces microflavus also produces the ionophore valinomycin. Streptomyces microflavus is also known to cause potato common scab disease in Korea.

== See also ==
- List of Streptomyces species
