= Carole Perry =

British chemist and academic

- Born: Carole Celia Perry; 1959 (age 66–67)
- Education: University of Oxford (BA, DPhil)
- Awards: Royal Society Wolfson Research Merit Award (2013)
- Scientific career
- Fields: Biomolecular Materials
- Workplaces: Nottingham Trent University; Brunel University; Karlsruhe Institute of Technology; Harvard University
- Thesis: Silicification in biological systems (1985)
- Doctoral advisor: Robert Williams
- Website: www.ntu.ac.uk/staff-profiles/science-technology/carole-perry

Carole Celia Perry (born March 1959) is a British chemist who is a professor at Nottingham Trent University. Her research investigates materials and physical chemistry, and the development of biomaterials for improving human health.

== Early life and education ==
Perry studied chemistry at the University of Oxford. She remained in Oxford for her doctoral research, supervised by Robert Williams where her research investigated silicification in biological systems.

== Research and career ==
Perry moved to St Hilda's College, Oxford as a junior research fellow. In 1987, she was appointed a lecturer at Brunel University. After six years at Brunel, Perry moved to Nottingham Trent University, where she worked as lecturer, reader and head of department. Perry spent parts of her career at Harvard University, University at Buffalo and the Weizmann Institute of Science. Perry works on biomaterials, such as silk-silica and silk-calcium phosphate materials for bone repair.

Perry has investigated biosilification and the role of silicon in bone health. In the poultry industry, the fast growth of chickens can give rise to skeletal issues. She developed a silicon food supplement that could be used to boost the bone strength of chickens. In 2014, Perry took part in the Royal Society pairing scheme, and job shadowed the politician Lilian Greenwood in the House of Commons.

=== Selected publications ===
- Paul Roach; David Farrar; Carole Perry (1 June 2005). "Interpretation of protein adsorption: surface-induced conformational changes". Journal of the American Chemical Society. 127 (22): 8168–8173. doi:10.1021/ja042898o. ISSN 0002-7863. PMID 15926845. Wikidata Q53673625.
- Paul Roach; David Farrar; Carole Perry (1 March 2006). "Surface tailoring for controlled protein adsorption: effect of topography at the nanometer scale and chemistry". Journal of the American Chemical Society. 128 (12): 3939–3945. doi:10.1021/ja056278e. ISSN 0002-7863. PMID 16551101. Wikidata Q82899420.
- Heather A Currie; Carole C Perry (6 October 2007). "Silica in plants: biological, biochemical and chemical studies". Annals of Botany. 100 (7): 1383–1389. doi:10.1093/aob/mcm247. ISSN 0305-7364. PMC 2759229. PMID 17921489. Wikidata Q40166580.

=== Awards and honours ===
Perry was awarded a Royal Society Wolfson Research Merit Award to identify new design rules and synthesis strategies for biomolecules.
