= Irving–Williams series =

Series in chemistry

The Irving–Williams series refers to the relative stabilities of complexes formed by transition metals. In 1953 Harry Irving and Robert Williams observed that the stability of complexes formed by divalent first-row transition metal ions generally increase across the period to a maximum stability at copper: Mn(II) < Fe(II) < Co(II) < Ni(II) < Cu(II) > Zn(II).

Specifically, the Irving–Williams series refers to the exchange of aqua (H_{2}O) ligands for any other ligand (L) within a metal complex. In other words, the Irving–Williams series is almost exclusively independent of the nature of the incoming ligand, L.

The main application of the series is to empirically suggest an order of stability within first row transition metal complexes (where the transition metal is in oxidation state II).

Another application of the Irving–Williams series is to use it as a correlation "ruler" in comparing the first stability constant for replacement of water in the aqueous ion by a ligand.

== Explanation ==
Three explanations are frequently used to explain the series:

1. The ionic radius is expected to decrease regularly from Mn(II) to Zn(II). This is the normal periodic trend and would account for the general increase in stability.
2. The crystal field stabilization energy (CFSE) increases from zero for Mn(II) to a maximum at Ni(II). This makes the complexes increasingly stable. CFSE for Zn(II) is zero.
3. Although the CFSE of Cu(II) is less than that of Ni(II), octahedral Cu(II) complexes are subject to the Jahn–Teller effect, which affords octahedral Cu(II) complexes additional stability.

However, none of the above explanations can satisfactorily explain the success of the Irving–Williams series in predicting the relative stabilities of transition metal complexes. A recent study of metal-thiolate complexes indicates that an interplay between covalent and electrostatic contributions in metal–ligand binding energies might result in the Irving–Williams series.

Some actual CFSE values for octahedral complexes of first-row transition metals (∆_{oct}) are 0.4Δ (4 Dq) for iron, 0.8Δ (8 Dq) for cobalt and 1.2Δ (12 Dq) for nickel. When the stability constants are quantitatively adjusted for these values they follow the trend that is predicted, in the absence of crystal field effects, between manganese and zinc. This was an important factor contributing to the acceptance of crystal field theory, the first theory to successfully account for the thermodynamic, spectroscopic and magnetic properties of complexes of the transition metal ions and precursor to ligand field theory.

Natural proteins' affinities for metal binding also follow the Irving–Williams series. However, in a recent study published in the journal Nature, researchers have reported a protein-design approach to overcome the Irving-Williams series restriction, allowing proteins to bind other metals over copper ions vice versa to Irving–Williams series.
