= Cerium(III) fluoride =

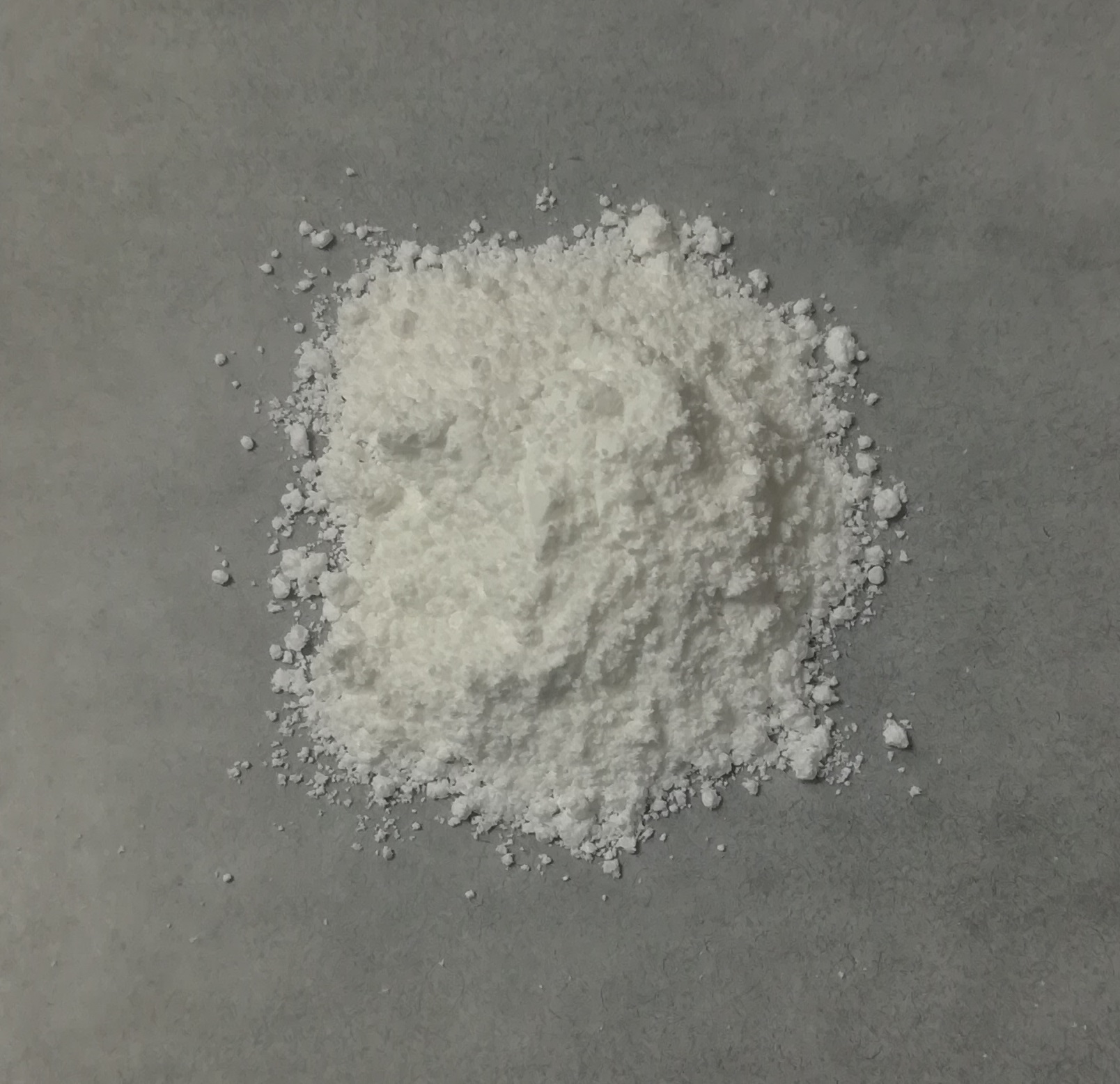

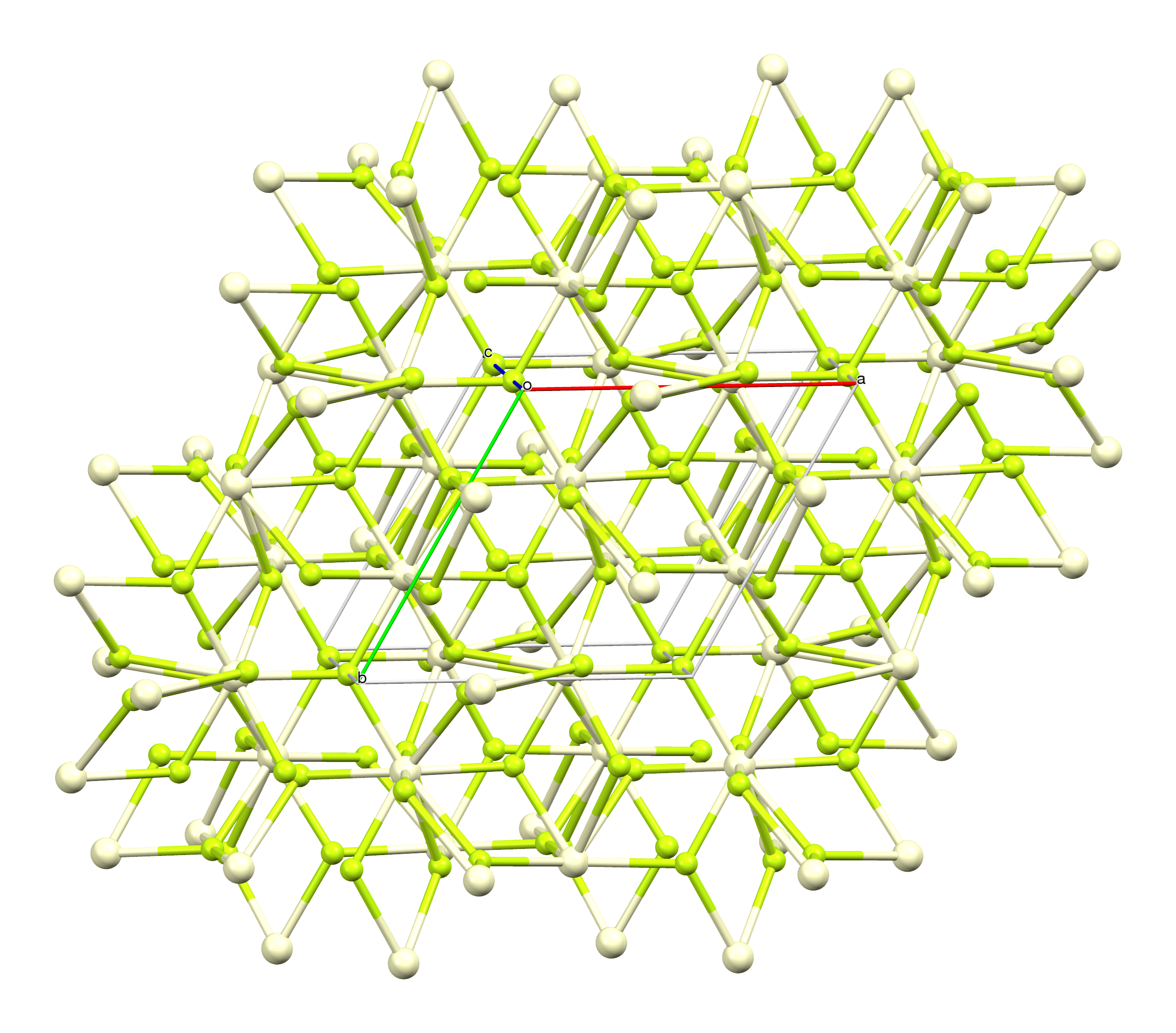

Names
- IUPAC name Cerium(III) fluoride
- Other names Cerium trifluoride

Identifiers
CAS Number	7758-88-5
3D model (JSmol)	Interactive image
ChemSpider	22865
ECHA InfoCard	100.028.947
EC Number	231-841-3
PubChem CID	24457
UNII	1GCT2G09AN
CompTox Dashboard (EPA)	DTXSID8052516
- InChI: InChI=1S/Ce.3FH/h;3*1H/q+3;;;/p-3 Key: QCCDYNYSHILRDG-UHFFFAOYSA-K
- SMILES: [F-].[F-].[F-].[Ce+3]

Properties
Chemical formula	CeF_{3}
Molar mass	197.12 g/mol
Density	6.16 g/cm^{3} (at 20 °C)
Melting point	1,460 °C (2,660 °F; 1,730 K)

Related compounds
Related compounds	Lanthanum trifluoride

Hazards
- GHS labelling
Pictograms	(GHS07: Exclamation mark) (GHS09: Environmental hazard)
NFPA 704 (fire diamond)	3 0 0
- Except where otherwise noted, data are given for materials in their standard state (at 25 °C [77 °F], 100 kPa). Infobox references

Cerium(III) fluoride (or cerium trifluoride), CeF_{3}, is an ionic compound of the rare earth metal cerium and fluorine.

It appears as a mineral in the form of fluocerite-(Ce) - a very rare mineral species related mainly to pegmatites and rarely to oxidation zones of some polymetallic ore deposits. CeF_{3} may be used as a Faraday rotator material in the visible, near-infrared and mid-infrared spectral range.

== Structure ==
The crystal structure of cerium(III) fluoride is described as the LaF_{3} or tysonite structure. It contains 9-coordinate cerium ions that adopt an approximately tricapped trigonal prismatic coordination geometry, although it can be considered 11-coordinate if two more distant fluorides are considered part of the cerium coordination environment. The three crystallographically independent fluoride ions are 3-coordinate and range in geometry from trigonal planar to pyramidal.

Coordination in cerium(III) fluoride
Cerium coordination	Fluorine F1 coordination	Fluorine F2 coordination	Fluorine F3 coordination
