= Michael T. Pope =

Michael Thor Pope
- Education: Oxford University
- Known for: synthetic inorganic, organometallic chemistry, structural inorganic chemistry, polyoxometalate chemistry
- Scientific career
- Fields: Chemistry
- Workplaces: Georgetown University
- Doctoral advisor: Robert Williams
- Doctoral students: Ulrich Kortz

Michael Pope was born in England on April 14, 1933. He received his early education from the primary school of Countess Wear and Exeter School. He received B.A. and D.Phil. degrees from Oxford University. He can be considered as one of the leading and most influential polyoxometalate chemists worldwide. Polyoxometalates are applicable to the fields of biochemistry and materials chemistry. His 1983 book entitled “Heteropoly and Isopoly Oxometalates” is the most cited reference in the field (>5500 citations).
