= Potassium selective electrode =

Potassium selective electrodes are a type of ion selective electrode used in biochemical and biophysical research, where measurements of potassium concentration in an aqueous solution are required, usually on a real time basis.

These electrodes are typical ion exchange resin membrane electrodes, using valinomycin, a potassium ionophore, as the ion carrier in the membrane to provide the potassium specificity.

This type of ion-selective electrode is subject to interference from (in declining order of magnitude) rubidium, cesium, ammonium, sodium, calcium, magnesium, and lithium. The most significant interference with measurement of potassium concentration is from the ammonium ion, which in practice is a problem where the ammonium concentration is approximately equal to or greater than the potassium concentration. Although sodium is usually present in high concentrations in biological preparations, the degree of interference is low enough to represent an error on the order of only 0.05 parts per million for the normal range of sodium concentration, requiring reduction of sodium only for measurements of very low potassium concentrations. Although the interference from rubidium or caesium is strong enough to require that these ions be present in much lower concentration than the potassium to be measured, this is not usually a problem in most experiments. Interference from calcium, magnesium, or lithium, on the other hand, is weak enough that their presence in normal concentrations is also usually not a problem.
