= Fluoride selective electrode =

A fluoride selective electrode is a type of ion selective electrode sensitive to the concentration of the fluoride ion. A common example is the lanthanum fluoride electrode.

== Lanthanum fluoride electrode ==
In the lanthanum fluoride electrode, the sensing element is a crystal of lanthanum fluoride (LaF_{3}), doped with europium(II) fluoride (EuF_{2}) to create lattice vacancies. Such a crystal is an ionic conductor by virtue of the mobility of fluoride ions which jump between lattice vacancies. An electrochemical cell may be constructed using such a crystal as a membrane separating two fluoride solutions. This cell acts as a concentration cell with transference where the fluoride transport number is 1. As transference of charge through the crystal is almost exclusively due to fluoride, the electrode is highly specific to fluoride. The only ion which significantly interferes is hydroxide (OH^{−}). Generally such "alkaline error" can be avoided by buffering the sample to a pH below 7.

=== Cell diagram ===
The cell diagram of a typical experimental arrangement is:

$\ce{Ag,AgCl|NaF|LaF3|}$fluoride analyte solution

where:

- $\ce{Hg|1/2Hg2Cl2 | KCl(sat)}$ is an external reference electrode
- $\ce{NaF,NaCl | AgCl,Ag |}$ is an internal reference inside the fluoride selective electrode

=== Reference electrode ===
Some commercially available reference electrodes have an internal junction which minimizes the liquid junction potential between the sample solution and the electrolyte in the reference electrode (KCl). The internal electrolyte is at fixed composition and the electrode response is given by the Nernst equation:

E = E^{0} − RT/F ln a_{F^{−}},

where:

- E is the measured cell potential,
- E^{0} is the standard cell potential,
- R is the ideal gas constant,
- T is the temperature in kelvins,
- F is the Faraday constant (9.6485309×10^{4} C/mol).
- a_{F^{−}} is the activity of the fluoride ion.
