= Harry Irving (chemist) =

British chemist

Harry Munroe Napier Hetherington Irving
- Born: 19 November 1905; Oxford, England
- Died: 20 June 1993 (aged 87); Cape Town, South Africa
- Education: The Queen's College, Oxford
- Scientific career
- Fields: Chemistry
- Workplaces: University of Oxford; University of Leeds; University of Cape Town

Harry Munroe Napier Hetherington Irving (19 November 1905 in Oxford – 20 June 1993 in Cape Town), often cited as H. M. N. H. Irving, was a British chemist.

== Education ==
As a student as The Queen's College, Oxford, Irving received a BA in 1928 and a DPhil in 1930, the same year he received his Licentiate of the Royal Academy of Music. In 1954, he was awarded a DSc.

== Career ==
Irving was a lecturer and demonstrator in chemistry at Oxford University from 1930 to 1961. He was also the Vice Principal of St Edmund Hall.

During the 1940s he began research into coordination chemistry. In 1953, Irving and his doctoral student Robert Williams described a periodic trend now known as the Irving–Williams Series.

Irving was Professor of Inorganic and Structural Chemistry at the University of Leeds between 1961 and 1971 and Professor of Analytical Science at the University of Cape Town between 1979 and 1985.

== Private life ==
Irving was a Freemason under the United Grand Lodge of England. Initiated in the Churchill Lodge No 478 (Oxford), he later joined the Apollo University Lodge No 357 (Oxford), to which he was proposed by fellow Oxford scientist Bertram Maurice Hobby. Irving served at different times as Worshipful Master of both lodges.

== Books authored ==
- H. M. N. H. Irving, H. Freiser and T. S. West, Compendium of analytical nomenclature : definitive rules, Pergamon Press 1977
- H. M. N. H. Irving, The Techniques of Analytical Chemistry: Short Historical Survey, Science Museum 1974
- H. M. N. H. Irving, Dithizone, Royal Society of Chemistry, 1977
