= Lanthanum trifluoride =

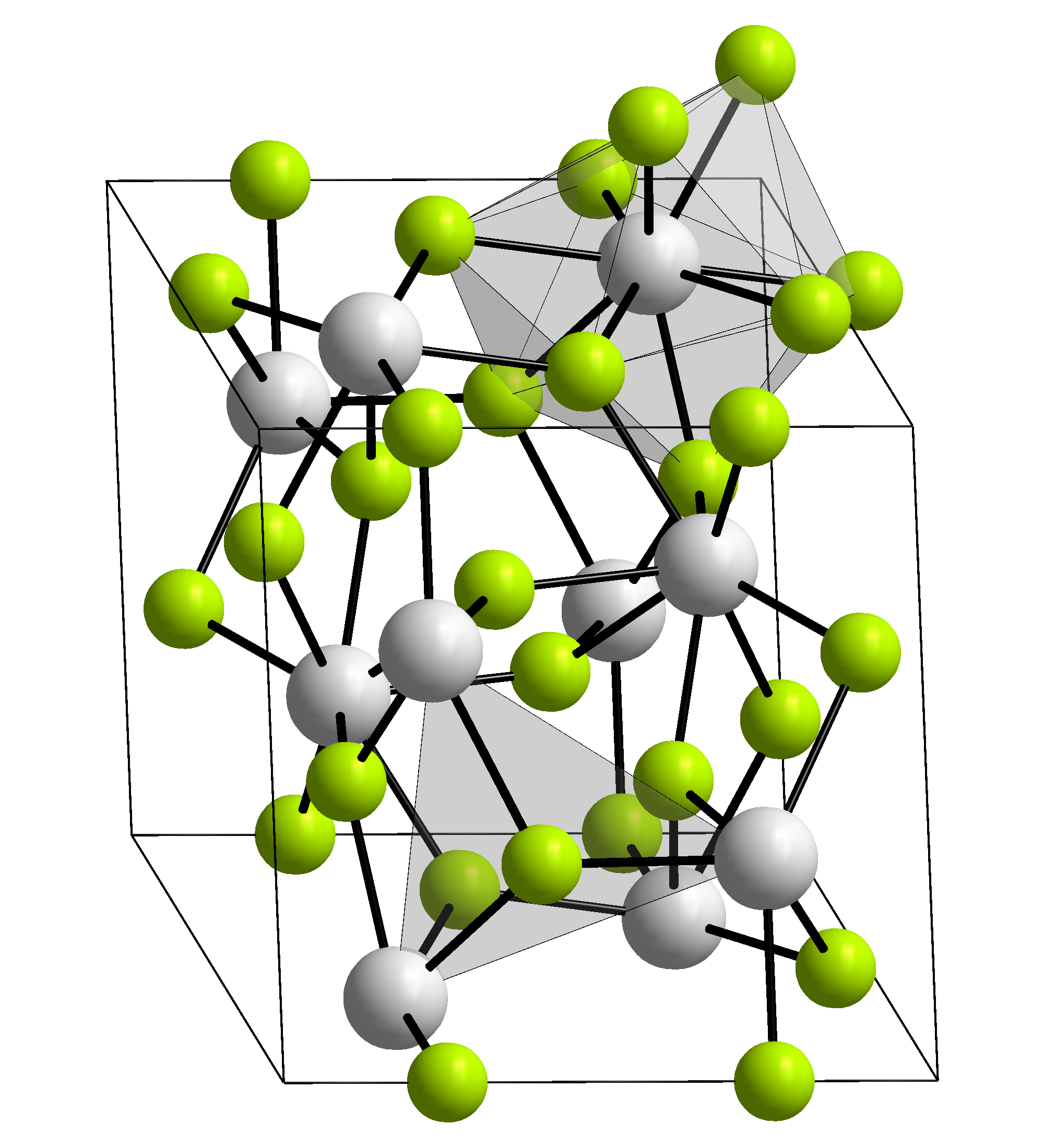
- Crystal structure

Names
- Other names Lanthanum(III) fluoride

Identifiers
| CAS Number | 13709-38-1 |
| 3D model (JSmol) | Interactive image |
| ChemSpider | 75498 |
| ECHA InfoCard | 100.033.851 |
| EC Number | 237-252-8 |
| PubChem CID | 83675 |
| CompTox Dashboard (EPA) | DTXSID2065591 |
- InChI: InChI=1S/La.3FH/h;3*1H/q+3;;;/p-3 Key: BYMUNNMMXKDFEZ-UHFFFAOYSA-K; InChI=1/La.3FH/h;3*1H/q+3;;;/p-3
- SMILES: F[La](F)F

Properties
| Chemical formula | LaF_{3} |
| Molar mass | 195.900 g/mol |
| Appearance | white, crystalline solid |
| Density | 5.9 g/cm^{3} |
| Melting point | 1,493 °C (2,719 °F; 1,766 K) |
| Refractive index (n_{D}) | 1.606 |

Structure
| Crystal structure | Rhombohedral, hR24 |
| Space group | P3̅c1, No. 165 |
| Lattice constant | a = 0.7185 nm, c = 0.7351 nm |
| Lattice volume (V) | 0.32865 |
| Formula units (Z) | 6 |

Hazards
| NFPA 704 (fire diamond) | pg 3 2 0 0 |
- Safety data sheet (SDS)

Related compounds
| Other anions | Lanthanum(III) chloride Lanthanum(III) bromide Lanthanum(III) iodide |
| Other cations | Actinium(III) fluoride |
- Except where otherwise noted, data are given for materials in their standard state (at 25 °C [77 °F], 100 kPa). verify (what is ?) Infobox references

Lanthanum trifluoride is a refractory ionic compound of lanthanum and fluorine. The chemical formula is LaF_{3}.

== The LaF_{3} structure ==
Lanthanum coordination

Bonding is ionic with lanthanum highly coordinated. The cation sits at the center of a trigonal prism. Nine fluorine atoms are close: three at the bottom corners of the trigonal prism, three in the faces of the trigonal prism, and three at top corners of the trigonal prism. There are also two fluorides a little further away above and below the prism. The cation can be considered 9-coordinate or 11-coordinate. At 300 K, the structure allows the formation of Schottky defects with an activation energy of 0.07 eV, and free flow of fluoride ions with an activation energy of 0.45 eV, making the crystal unusually electrically conductive.

The larger sized rare earth elements (lanthanides), which are those with smaller atomic number, also form trifluorides with the LaF_{3} structure. Some actinides do as well.

== Synthesis ==
The synthesis of lanthanum trifluoride can be performed in multiple ways depending whether it is required to be anhydrous or not. If anhydrous material is not required, LaF_{3} can be synthesized via the addition of aqueous hydrofluoric acid to an aqueous solution of a soluble lanthanum salt, such as lanthanum nitrate or chloride via the following reactions:

$\ce{La(NO3)3*6H2O(aq) + 3HF(aq) -> LaF3(s)v + 3HNO3(aq) + 6H2O(l)}$

$\ce{LaCl3(aq) + 3HF(aq) -> LaF3(s)v + 3HCl(aq)}$

If anhydrous product is required, LaF_{3} may be synthesized via the reaction of lanthanum oxide with anhydrous hydrogen fluoride via the following reaction:

$\ce{La2O3(s) + 6HF(g) ->[approx. 600c] 2LaF3(s) + 3H2O(g)}$

== Applications ==
This white salt is sometimes used as the "high-index" component in multilayer optical elements such as ultraviolet dichroic and narrowband mirrors. Fluorides are among the most commonly used compounds for UV optical coatings due to their relative inertness and transparency in the far ultraviolet (FUV) (100 nm < λ < 200 nm). Multilayer reflectors and antireflection coatings are typically composed of pairs of transparent materials, one with a low index of refraction, the other with a high index. LaF_{3} is one of very few high-index materials in the far UV. The material is also a component of multimetal fluoride glasses such as ZBLAN. It is also doped with europium(II) fluoride in fluoride selective electrodes.

== Natural occurrence ==
LaF_{3} occurs in the nature as the extremely rare mineral fluocerite-(La). The suffix in the name is known as the Levinson modifier and, by showing the dominant element at a particular site in the structure, is used to differentiate from similar minerals (here: fluocerite-(Ce)).
