= Valinomycin =

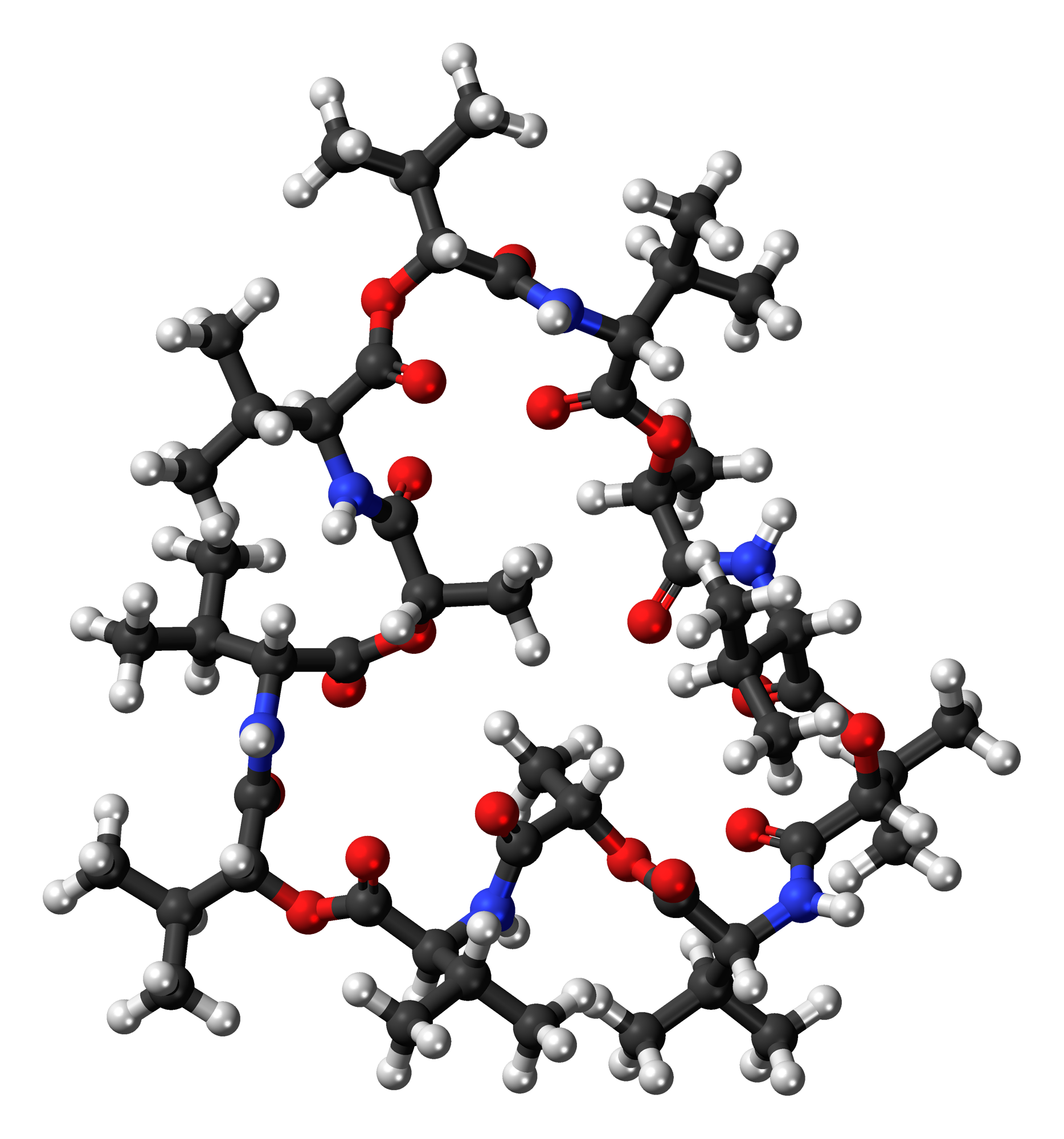

Names
- IUPAC name cyclo[N-oxa-D-alanyl-D-valyl-N-oxa-L-valyl-D-valyl-N-oxa-D-alanyl-D-valyl-N-oxa-L-valyl-L-valyl-N-oxa-L-alanyl-L-valyl-N-oxa-L-valyl-L-valyl]

Identifiers
CAS Number	2001-95-8
3D model (JSmol)	: Interactive image
ChEBI	CHEBI:28545
ChEMBL	ChEMBL223643
ChemSpider	21493802
DrugBank	DB14057
ECHA InfoCard	100.016.270
EC Number	217-896-6
PubChem CID	3000706
UNII	N561YS75MN
UN number	2811 2588
CompTox Dashboard (EPA)	DTXSID9041150
- InChI: InChI=1S/C54H90N6O18/c1-22(2)34-49(67)73-31(19)43(61)55-38(26(9)10)53(71)77-41(29(15)16)47(65)59-36(24(5)6)51(69)75-33(21)45(63)57-39(27(11)12)54(72)78-42(30(17)18)48(66)60-35(23(3)4)50(68)74-32(20)44(62)56-37(25(7)8)52(70)76-40(28(13)14)46(64)58-34/h22-42H,1-21H3,(H,55,61)(H,56,62)(H,57,63)(H,58,64)(H,59,65)(H,60,66)/t31-,32-,33-,34+,35+,36+,37-,38-,39-,40+,41+,42+/m0/s1 Key: FCFNRCROJUBPLU-DNDCDFAISA-N; InChI=1S/C54H90N6O18/c1-22(2)34-49(67)73-31(19)43(61)55-38(26(9)10)53(71)77-41(29(15)16)47(65)59-36(24(5)6)51(69)75-33(21)45(63)57-39(27(11)12)54(72)78-42(30(17)18)48(66)60-35(23(3)4)50(68)74-32(20)44(62)56-37(25(7)8)52(70)76-40(28(13)14)46(64)58-34/h22-42H,1-21H3,(H,55,61)(H,56,62)(H,57,63)(H,58,64)(H,59,65)(H,60,66)/t31-,32-,33+,34-,35+,36+,37-,38-,39+,40+,41+,42+/m1/s1 Key: FCFNRCROJUBPLU-DNDCDFAIBE
- SMILES: : C[C@@H]1C(=O)N[C@@H](C(=O)O[C@H](C(=O)N[C@@H](C(=O)O[C@@H](C(=O)N[C@@H](C(=O)O[C@H](C(=O)N[C@H](C(=O)O[C@H](C(=O)N[C@H](C(=O)O[C@H](C(=O)N[C@H](C(=O)O1)C(C)C)C(C)C)C(C)C)C)C(C)C)C(C)C)C(C)C)C)C(C)C)C(C)C)C(C)C

Properties
Chemical formula	C_{54}H_{90}N_{6}O_{18}
Molar mass	1111.338 g·mol^{−1}
Appearance	White solid
Melting point	190 °C (374 °F; 463 K)
Solubility	Methanol, ethanol, ethyl acetate, petrol-ether, dichloromethane
UV-vis (λ_{max})	220 nm

Hazards
- Occupational safety and health (OHS/OSH)
Main hazards	Neurotoxicant
- GHS labelling
Pictograms	(GHS06: Toxic)
Signal word	Danger
Hazard statements	H300, H310
Precautionary statements	P262, P264, P270, P280, P301+P310, P302+P350, P310, P321, P322, P330, P361, P363, P405, P501
- Lethal dose or concentration (LD, LC)
LD_{50} (median dose)	4 mg/kg (oral, rat)
- Except where otherwise noted, data are given for materials in their standard state (at 25 °C [77 °F], 100 kPa). verify (what is ?) Infobox references

Valinomycin is a naturally occurring dodecadepsipeptide used in the transport of potassium and as an antibiotic. Valinomycin is obtained from the cells of several Streptomyces species, S. fulvissimus being a notable one.

It is a member of the group of natural neutral ionophores because it does not have a residual charge. It consists of the enantiomers D- and L-valine (Val), D-alpha-hydroxyisovaleric acid, and L-lactic acid. Structures are alternately bound via amide and ester bridges. Valinomycin is highly selective for potassium ions over sodium ions within the cell membrane. It functions as a potassium-specific transporter and facilitates the movement of potassium ions through lipid membranes "down" the electrochemical potential gradient. The stability constant K for the potassium-valinomycin complex is nearly 100,000 times larger than that of the sodium-valinomycin complex. This difference is important for maintaining the selectivity of valinomycin for the transport of potassium ions (and not sodium ions) in biological systems.

It is classified as an extremely hazardous substance in the United States as defined in Section 302 of the U.S. Emergency Planning and Community Right-to-Know Act (42 U.S.C. 11002), and is subject to strict reporting requirements by facilities which produce, store, or use it in significant quantities.

== Structure ==
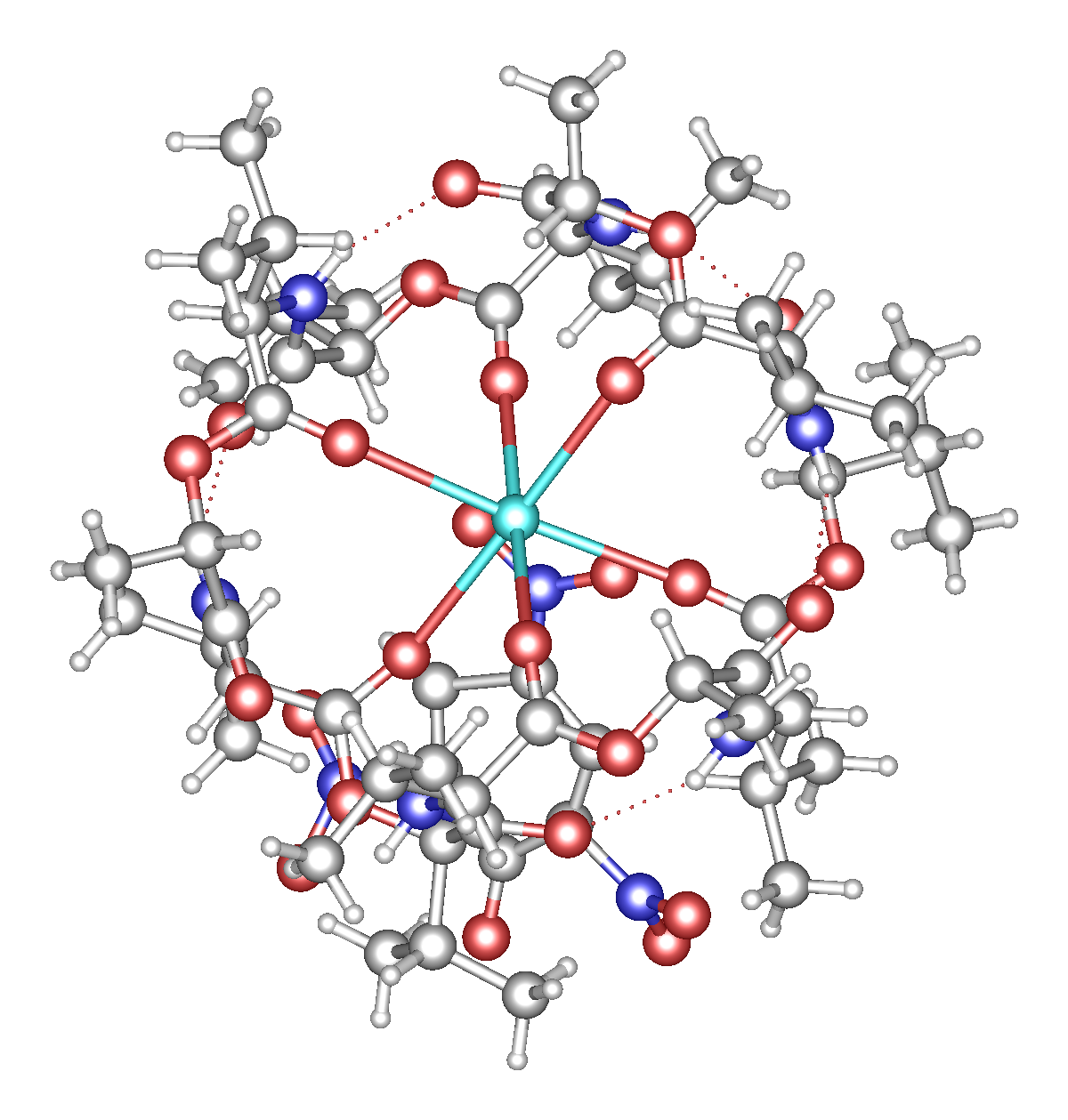
Structure from X-ray crystallography of the potassium (turquoise-colored) cation bound to valinomycin.

Valinomycin is a dodecadepsipeptide, that is, it is made of twelve alternating amino acids and esters to form a macrocyclic molecule. The twelve carbonyl groups are essential for the binding of metal ions, and also for solvation in polar solvents. The isopropyl and methyl groups are responsible for solvation in nonpolar solvents. Along with its shape and size this molecular duality is the main reason for its binding properties. K ions must give up their water of hydration to pass through the pore. K^{+} ions are octahedrally coordinated in a square bipyramidal geometry by 6 carbonyl bonds from Val. In this space of 1.33 Angstrom, Na^{+} with its 0.95 Angstrom radius, is significantly smaller than the channel, meaning that Na^{+} cannot form ionic bonds with the amino acids of the pore at equivalent energy as those it gives up with the water molecules. This leads to a 10,000x selectivity for K^{+} ions over Na^{+}. For polar solvents, valinomycin will mainly expose the carbonyls to the solvent and in nonpolar solvents the isopropyl groups are located predominantly on the exterior of the molecule. This conformation changes when valinomycin is bound to a potassium ion. The molecule is "locked" into a conformation with the isopropyl groups on the exterior [Citation Needed]. It is not actually locked into configuration because the size of the molecule makes it highly flexible, but the potassium ion gives some degree of coordination to the macromolecule.

== Applications ==
Valinomycin was recently reported to be the most potent agent against severe acute respiratory-syndrome coronavirus (SARS-CoV) in infected Vero E6 cells. Valinomycin has been shown to inhibit completely vaccinia virus in cell based assay in human cell line.

Valinomycin acts as a nonmetallic isoforming agent in potassium selective electrodes.

This ionophore is used to study membrane vesicles, where it may be selectively applied by experimental design to reduce or eliminate the electrochemical gradient across a membrane.
