= Radioactivity in the life sciences =

Radioactivity is generally used in life sciences for highly sensitive and direct measurements of biological phenomena, and for visualizing the location of biomolecules radiolabelled with a radioisotope.

All atoms exist as stable or unstable isotopes and the latter decay at a given half-life ranging from attoseconds to billions of years; radioisotopes useful to biological and experimental systems have half-lives ranging from minutes to months. In the case of the hydrogen isotope tritium (half-life = 12.3 years) and carbon-14 (half-life = 5,730 years), these isotopes derive their importance from all organic life containing hydrogen and carbon and therefore can be used to study countless living processes, reactions, and phenomena. Most short lived isotopes are produced in cyclotrons, linear particle accelerators, or nuclear reactors and their relatively short half-lives give them high maximum theoretical specific activities which is useful for detection in biological systems.

DOTA linked to the monoclonal antibody tacatuzumab and chelating yttrium-90

Whole-body PET scan using ^{18}F-FDG showing intestinal tumors and non-specific accumulation in bladder

Radiolabeling is a technique used to track the passage of a molecule that incorporates a radioisotope through a reaction, metabolic pathway, cell, tissue, organism, or biological system. The reactant is 'labeled' by replacing specific atoms by their isotope. Replacing an atom with its own radioisotope is an intrinsic label that does not alter the structure of the molecule. Alternatively, molecules can be radiolabeled by chemical reactions that introduce an atom, moiety, or functional group that contains a radionuclide. For example, radio-iodination of peptides and proteins with biologically useful iodine isotopes is easily done by an oxidation reaction that replaces the hydroxyl group with iodine on tyrosine and histadine residues. Another example is to use chelators such DOTA that can be chemically coupled to a protein; the chelator in turn traps radiometals thus radiolabeling the protein. This has been used for introducing Yttrium-90 onto a monoclonal antibody for therapeutic purposes and for introducing Gallium-68 onto the peptide Octreotide for diagnostic imaging by PET imaging. (See DOTA uses.)

Radiolabeling is not necessary for some applications. For some purposes, soluble ionic salts can be used directly without further modification (e.g., gallium-67, gallium-68, and radioiodine isotopes). These uses rely on the chemical and biological properties of the radioisotope itself, to localize it within the organism or biological system.

Molecular imaging is the biomedical field that employs radiotracers to visualize and quantify biological processes using positron emission tomography (PET) and single-photon emission computed tomography (SPECT) imaging. Again, a key feature of using radioactivity in life science applications is that it is a quantitative technique, so PET/SPECT not only reveals where a radiolabelled molecule is but how much is there.

Radiobiology (also known as radiation biology) is a field of clinical and basic medical sciences that involves the study of the action of radioactivity on biological systems. The controlled action of deleterious radioactivity on living systems is the basis of radiation therapy.

== Examples of biologically useful radionuclides ==
=== Hydrogen ===
Tritium (hydrogen-3) is a very low beta energy emitter that can be used to label proteins, nucleic acids, drugs and almost any organic biomolecule. The maximum theoretical specific activity of tritium is 28.8 kCi/mol (1,070 TBq/mol). However, there is often more than one tritium atom per molecule: for example, tritiated UTP is sold by most suppliers with carbons 5 and 6 each bonded to a tritium atom.

For tritium detection, liquid scintillation counters have been classically employed, in which the energy of a tritium decay is transferred to a scintillant molecule in solution which in turn gives off photons whose intensity and spectrum can be measured by a photomultiplier array. The efficiency of this process is 4–50%, depending on the scintillation cocktail used. The measurements are typically expressed in counts per minute (CPM) or disintegrations per minute (DPM). Alternatively, a solid-state, tritium-specific phosphor screen can be used together with a phosphorimager to measure and simultaneously image the radiotracer. Measurements/images are digital in nature and can be expressed in intensity or densitometry units within a region of interest (ROI).

=== Carbon ===
Carbon-14 has a long half-life of 5730±40 years. Its maximum specific activity is 0.0624 kCi/mol (2.31 TBq/mol). It is used in applications such as radiometric dating or drug tests. Carbon-14 labeling is common in drug development to do ADME (absorption, distribution, metabolism and excretion) studies in animal models and in human toxicology and clinical trials. Since tritium exchange may occur in some radiolabeled compounds, this does not happen with carbon-14 and may thus be preferred.

=== Sodium ===
Sodium-22 and chlorine-36 are commonly used to study ion transporters. However, sodium-22 is hard to screen off and chlorine-36, with a half-life of 300,000 years, has low activity.

=== Sulfur ===
Sulfur-35 is used to label proteins and nucleic acids. Cysteine is an amino acid containing a thiol group which can be labeled by sulfur-35. For nucleotides that do not contain a sulfur group, the oxygen on one of the phosphate groups can be substituted with a sulfur. This thiophosphate acts the same as a normal phosphate group, although there is a slight bias against it by most polymerases. The maximum theoretical specific activity is 1,494 kCi/mol (55.3 PBq/mol).

=== Phosphorus ===
Phosphorus-32 is widely used for labeling nucleic acids and phosphoproteins. It has the highest emission energy (1.7 MeV) of all common research radioisotopes. This is a major advantage in experiments for which sensitivity is a primary consideration, such as titrations of very strong interactions (i.e., very low dissociation constant), footprinting experiments, and detection of low-abundance phosphorylated species. Phosphorus-32 is also relatively inexpensive. Because of its high energy, however, its safe use requires a number of engineering controls (e.g., acrylic glass) and administrative controls. The half-life of phosphorus-32 is 14.2 days, and its maximum specific activity is 9,131 kCi/mol (337.8 PBq/mol).

Phosphorus-33 is used to label nucleotides. It is less energetic than phosphorus-32 and does not require protection with plexiglass. A disadvantage is its higher cost compared to phosphorus-32, as most of the bombarded phosphorus-31 will have acquired only one neutron, while only some will have acquired two or more. Its maximum specific activity is 5,118 kCi/mol (189.4 PBq/mol).

=== Iodine ===
Iodine-125 is commonly used for labeling proteins, usually at tyrosine residues. Unbound iodine is volatile and must be handled in a fume hood. Its maximum specific activity is 2,176 kCi/mol (80.5 PBq/mol).

A good example of the difference in energy of the various radionuclei is the detection window ranges used to detect them, which are generally proportional to the energy of the emission, but vary from machine to machine: in a Perkin elmer TriLux Beta scintillation counter, the hydrogen-3 energy range window is between channel 5–360; carbon-14, sulfur-35 and phosphorus-33 are in the window of 361–660; and phosphorus-32 is in the window of 661–1024.

== Detection ==
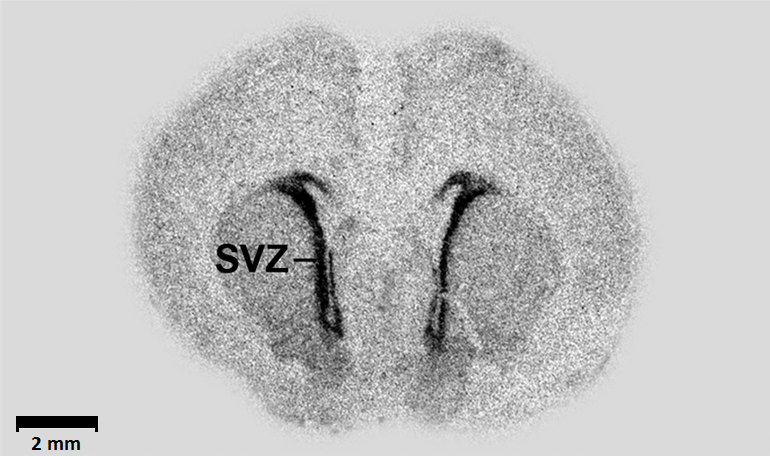
Autoradiograph of a coronal brain tissue slice, with a radiolabeled GAD67 probe. Most intense signal is seen in subventricular zone.

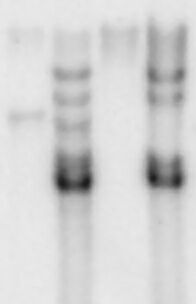
Autoradiograph of Southern blot membrane

=== Quantitative ===
In liquid scintillation counting, a small aliquot, filter or swab is added to scintillation fluid and the plate or vial is placed in a scintillation counter to measure the radioactive emissions. Manufacturers have incorporated solid scintillants into multi-well plates to eliminate the need for scintillation fluid and make this into a high-throughput technique.

A gamma counter is similar in format to scintillation counting but it detects gamma emissions directly and does not require a scintillant.

A Geiger counter is a quick and rough approximation of activity. Lower energy emitters such as tritium can not be detected.

=== Qualitative AND Quantitative ===
Autoradiography: A tissue section affixed to a microscope slide or a membrane such as a Northern blot or a hybridized slot blot can be placed against x-ray film or phosphor screens to acquire a photographic or digital image. The density of exposure, if calibrated, can supply exacting quantitative information.

Phosphor storage screen: The slide or membrane is placed against a phosphor screen which is then scanned in a phosphorimager. This is many times faster than film/emulsion techniques and outputs data in a digital form, thus it has largely replaced film/emulsion techniques.

=== Microscopy ===
Electron microscopy: The sample is not exposed to a beam of electrons but detectors picks up the expelled electrons from the radionuclei.

Micro-autoradiography: A tissue section, typically cryosectioned, is placed against a phosphor screen as above.

Quantitative Whole Body Autoradiography (QWBA): Larger than micro-autoradiography, whole animals, typically rodents, can be analyzed for biodistribution studies.

== Scientific methods ==
Schild regression is a radioligand binding assay. It is used for DNA labelling (5' and 3'), leaving the nucleic acids intact.

== Radioactivity concentration ==
A vial of radiolabel has a "total activity". Taking as an example γ32P ATP, from the catalogues of the two major suppliers, Perkin Elmer NEG502H500UC or GE AA0068-500UCI, in this case, the total activity is 500 μCi (other typical numbers are 250 μCi or 1 mCi). This is contained in a certain volume, depending on the radioactive concentration, such as 5 to 10 mCi/mL (185 to 370 TBq/m^{3}); typical volumes include 50 or 25 μL.

Not all molecules in the solution have a P-32 on the last (i.e., gamma) phosphate: the "specific activity" gives the radioactivity concentration and depends on the radionuclei's half-life. If every molecule were labelled, the maximum theoretical specific activity is obtained that for P-32 is 9131 Ci/mmol. Due to pre-calibration and efficiency issues this number is never seen on a label; the values often found are 800, 3000 and 6000 Ci/mmol. With this number it is possible to calculate the total chemical concentration and the hot-to-cold ratio.

"Calibration date" is the date in which the vial's activity is the same as on the label. "Pre-calibration" is when the activity is calibrated in a future date to compensate for the decay occurred during shipping.

== Comparison with fluorescence ==
Prior to the widespread use of fluorescence in the past three decades radioactivity was the most common label.

The primary advantage of fluorescence over radiotracers is that it does not require radiological controls and their associated expenses and safety measures. The decay of radioisotopes may limit the shelf life of a reagent, requiring its replacement and thus increasing expenses. Several fluorescent molecules can be used simultaneously (given that they do not overlap, cf. FRET), whereas with radioactivity two isotopes can be used (tritium and a low energy isotope, e.g. ^{33}P due to different intensities) but require special equipment (a tritium screen and a regular phosphor-imaging screen, a specific dual channel detector, e.g. ).

Fluorescence is not necessary easier or more convenient to use because fluorescence requires specialized equipment of its own and because quenching makes absolute and/or reproducible quantification difficult.

The primary disadvantage of fluorescence versus radiotracers is a significant biological problem: chemically tagging a molecule with a fluorescent dye radically changes the structure of the molecule, which in turn can radically change the way that molecule interacts with other molecules. In contrast, intrinsic radiolabeling of a molecule can be done without altering its structure in any way. For example, substituting a H-3 for a hydrogen atom or C-14 for a carbon atom does not change the conformation, structure, or any other property of the molecule, it's just switching forms of the same atom. Thus an intrinsically radiolabeled molecule is identical to its unlabeled counterpart.

Measurement of biological phenomena by radiotracers is always direct. In contrast, many life science fluorescence applications are indirect, consisting of a fluorescent dye increasing, decreasing, or shifting in wavelength emission upon binding to the molecule of interest.

== Safety ==
If good health physics controls are maintained in a laboratory where radionuclides are used, it is unlikely that the overall radiation dose received by workers will be of much significance. Nevertheless, the effects of low doses are mostly unknown so many regulations exist to avoid unnecessary risks, such as skin or internal exposure. Due to the low penetration power and many variables involved it is hard to convert a radioactive concentration to a dose. 1 μCi of P-32 on a square centimetre of skin (through a dead layer of a thickness of 70 μm) gives 7961 rads (79.61 grays) per hour. Similarly a mammogram gives an exposure of 300 mrem (3 mSv) on a larger volume (in the US, the average annual dose is 620 mrem or 6.2 mSv ).

== See also ==
- Radiopharmacology
- Radiation biology
- Radiation poisoning
- Background radiation
- Radiography
- Prehydrated electrons
