= DOTAM =

Organic compound used as a chelator

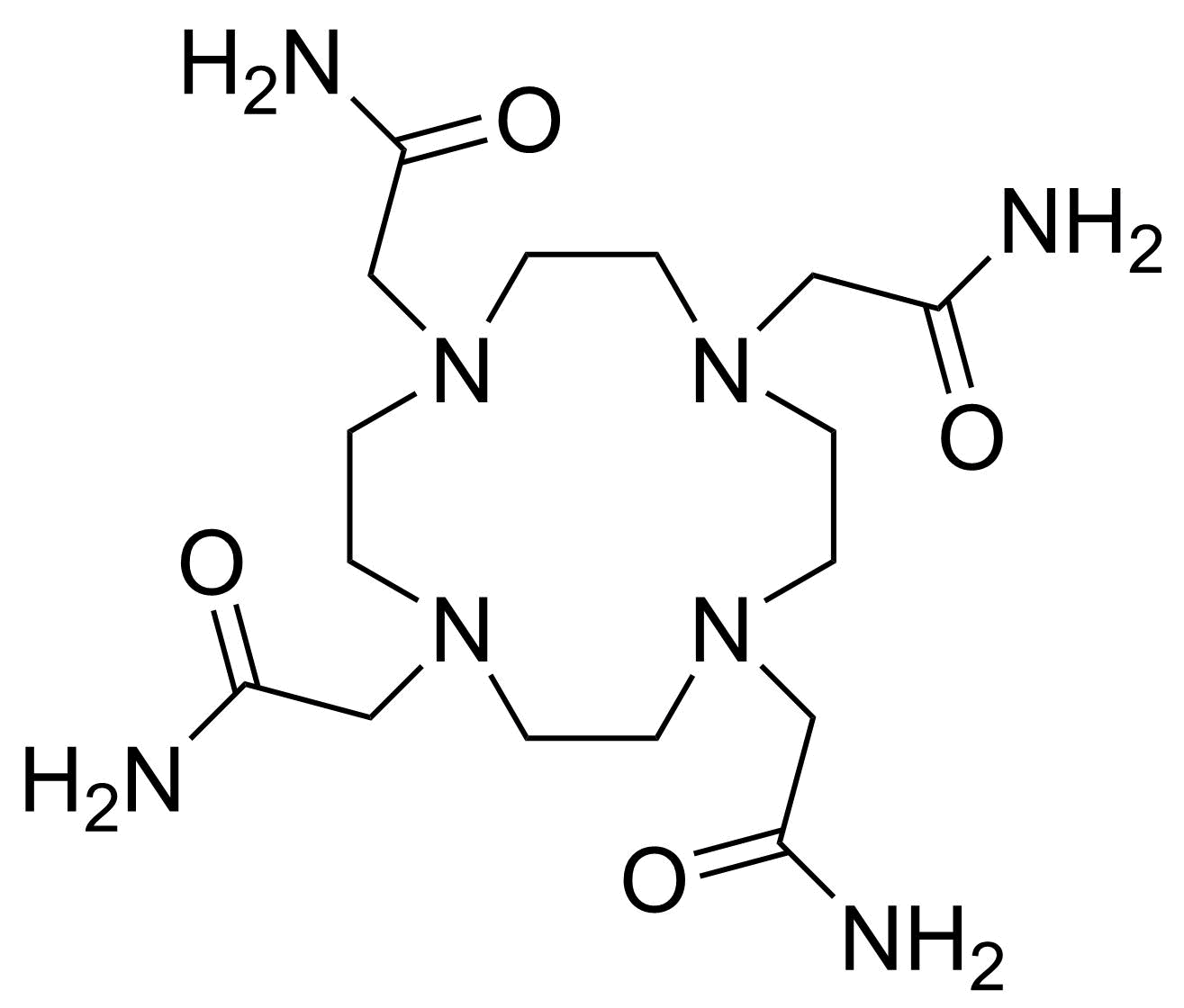

Names
- IUPAC name 2-[4,7,10-tris(2-amino-2-oxoethyl)-1,4,7,10-tetrazacyclododec-1-yl]acetamide
- Other names: TCMC; 2,2′,2”,2”’-(1,4,7,10-tetraazacyclododecane-1,4,7,10-tetrayl)tetraacetamide; 1,4,7,10-tetraazacyclododecane-1,4,7,10-tetraacetic amide; 1,4,7,10-tetraaza-1,4,7,10-tetra(2-carbamoylmethyl)cyclododecane

Identifiers
CAS Number	157599-02-5
3D model (JSmol)	Interactive image
ChemSpider	9735169
PubChem CID	11560395
UNII	XB23C79EWF
CompTox Dashboard (EPA)	DTXSID90468610
- InChI: Key: FQIHLPGWBOBPSG-UHFFFAOYSA-N; InChI=1S/C16H32N8O4/c17-13(25)9-21-1-2-22(10-14(18)26)5-6-24(12-16(20)28)8-7-23(4-3-21)11-15(19)27/h1-12H2,(H2,17,25)(H2,18,26)(H2,19,27)(H2,20,28)
- SMILES: NC(CN1CCN(CC(N)=O)CCN(CC(N)=O)CCN(CC(N)=O)CC1)=O

Properties
Chemical formula	C_{16}H_{32}N_{8}O_{4}
Molar mass	400.484 g·mol^{−1}
Appearance	White powder
Solubility in water	Soluble (hygroscopic)

Hazards
- GHS labelling
Pictograms	(GHS07: Exclamation mark)
Signal word	Warning
Hazard statements	H315, H319, H335
- Except where otherwise noted, data are given for materials in their standard state (at 25 °C [77 °F], 100 kPa). Infobox references

DOTAM (also sometimes known as TCMC) is an organic ligand used as a chelator much like its carboxylic acid analog DOTA, but shows greater selectivity for large covalently binding metal ions. It was designed and first synthesized by Robert D. Hancock and coworkers in 1995 for the selective complexation of the large covalently binding metal ions Cd(II) and Pb(II) based on Hancock’s theories of ligand design involving neutral oxygen donor atoms. The name DOTAM derives from its carboxylic acid analog DOTA by addition of an M to designate through the AM ending the presence of amide rather than carboxylate groups, as applies also to other ligands studied since such as EDTAM derived from EDTA. A derivative with a reactive linking group of para-isothiocyanatobenzyl attached to the cyclen ring for attachment to antibodies selective for particular types of cancer and in other applications is also of interest as a bifunctional chelator (BFC).

At present the Pb-DOTAMTATE 212-Pb (alpha particle emitter) bioconjugate has been approved for clinical use in treating patients with gastroenteropancreatic neuroendocrine tumors (AlphaMedix press release).

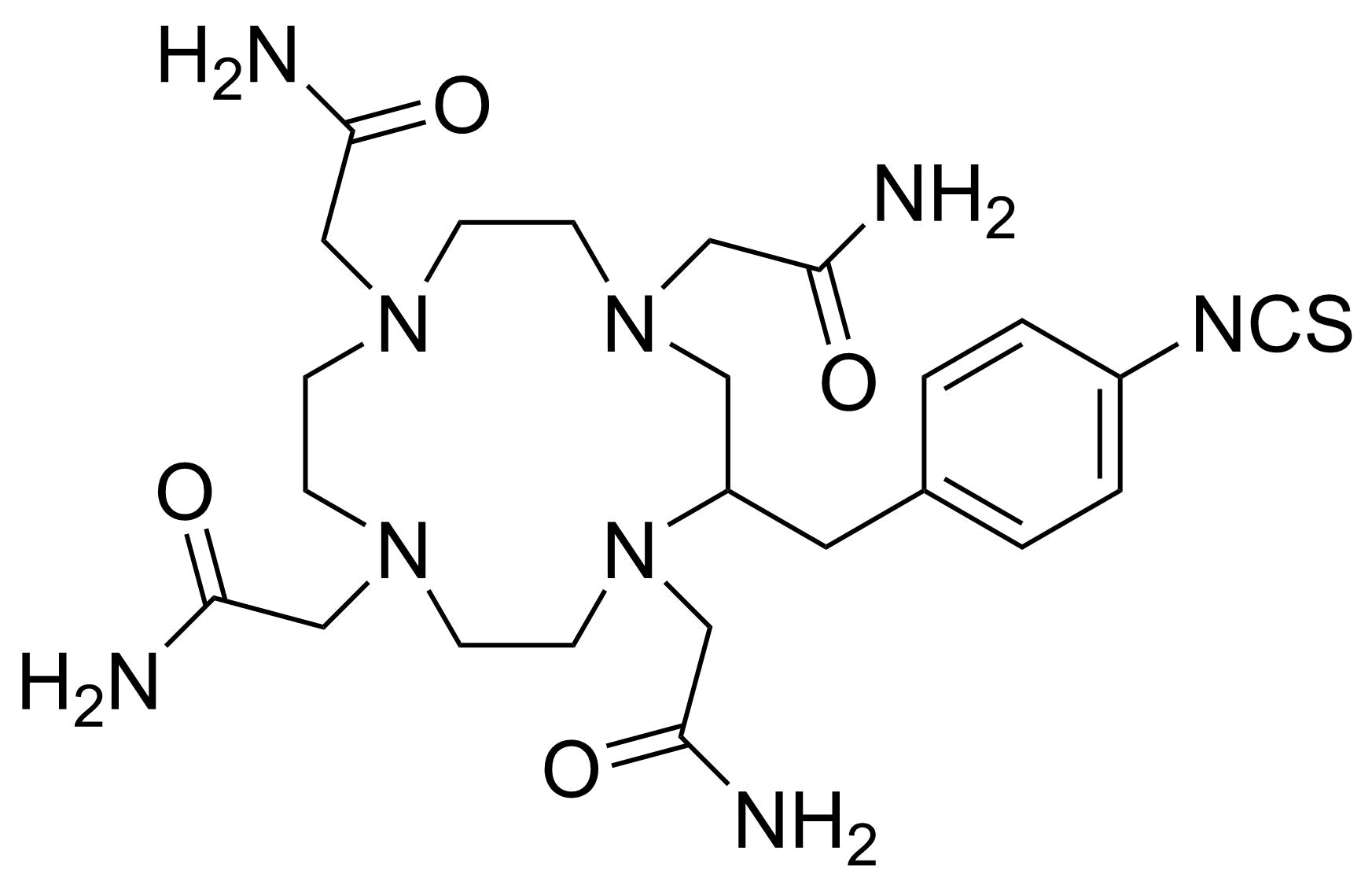
p-SCN-Bn-DOTAM
