= Yttrium (90Y) clivatuzumab tetraxetan =

Pharmaceutical drug

Yttrium (^{90}Y) clivatuzumab tetraxetan
Monoclonal antibody
- Type: Whole antibody
- Source: Humanized (from mouse)
- Target: MUC1

Clinical data
- ATC code: none

Identifiers
- CAS Number: 943976-23-6
- ChemSpider: none
- UNII: 2L271110ED

Chemical and physical data
- Formula: C_{6496}H_{9952}N_{1716}O_{2014}S_{44}
- Molar mass: 145723.71 g·mol^{−1}

Yttrium (^{90}Y) clivatuzumab tetraxetan (trade name hPAM4-Cide) is a humanized monoclonal antibody-drug conjugate designed for the treatment of pancreatic cancer. The antibody part, clivatuzumab (targeted at MUC1), is conjugated with tetraxetan, a chelator for yttrium-90, a radioisotope which destroys the tumour cells.

The drug was developed by Immunomedics, Inc.

In March 2016 the phase III PANCRIT-1 trial in metastatic pancreatic cancer was terminated early due to lack of improvement of overall survival.
