= C16H28N4O8 =

The molecular formula C_{16}H_{28}N_{4}O_{8} may refer to:

- Alcaligin
- DOTA (chelator), also known as tetraxetan
