= 1,4,7-Triazacyclononane =

- 1,4,7-Triazacyclononane

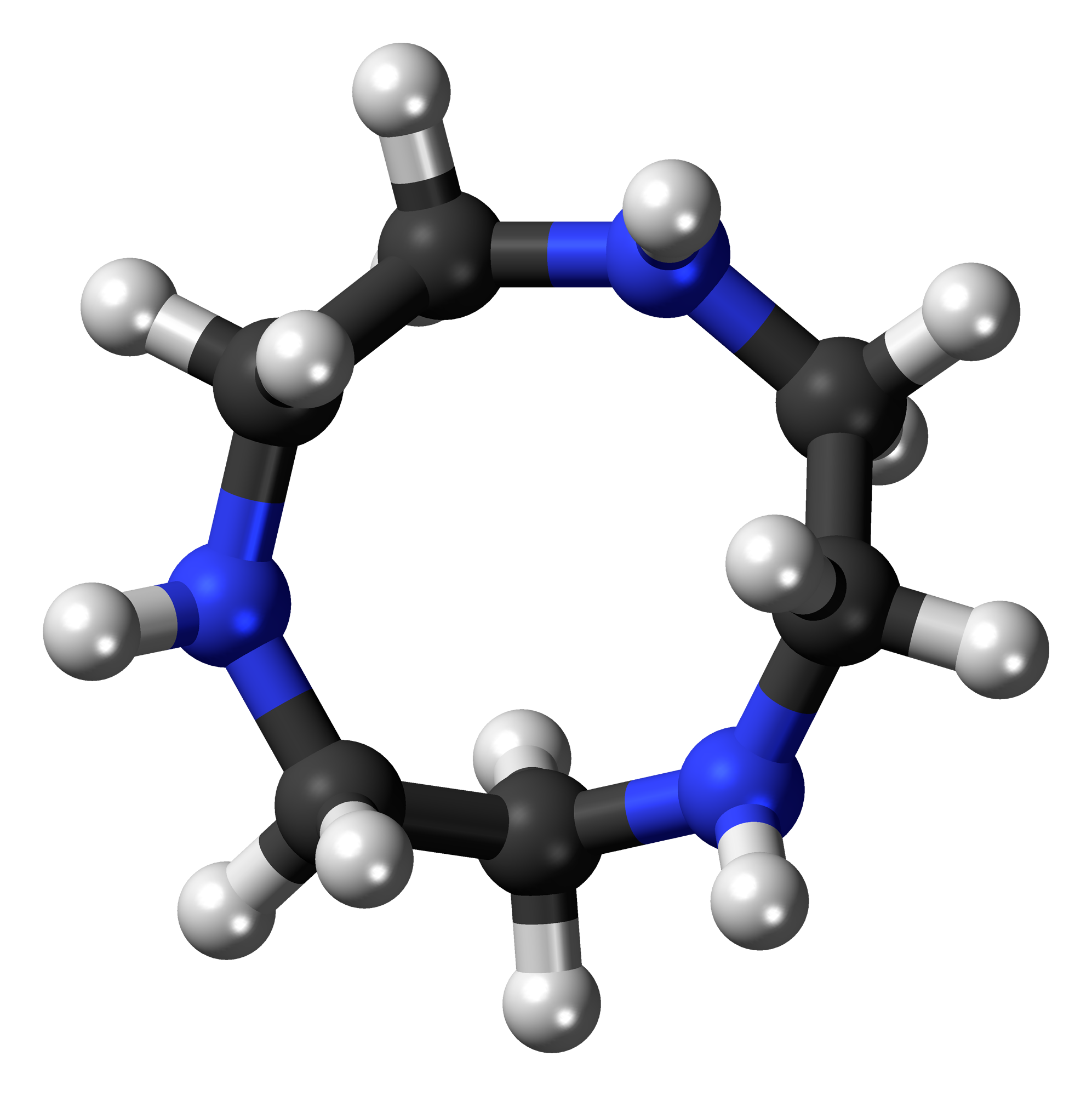

Names
- Preferred IUPAC name 1,4,7-Triazonane

Identifiers
CAS Number	4730-54-5
3D model (JSmol)	Interactive image
Beilstein Reference	773877
ChEBI	CHEBI:37405
ChEMBL	ChEMBL1650628
ChemSpider	163681
ECHA InfoCard	100.164.887
EC Number	637-157-5
Gmelin Reference	2614
PubChem CID	188318
UNII	2UIF93C5H3
CompTox Dashboard (EPA)	DTXSID50197095
- InChI: InChI=1S/C6H15N3/c1-2-8-5-6-9-4-3-7-1/h7-9H,1-6H2 Key: ITWBWJFEJCHKSN-UHFFFAOYSA-N; InChI=1/C6H15N3/c1-2-8-5-6-9-4-3-7-1/h7-9H,1-6H2 Key: ITWBWJFEJCHKSN-UHFFFAOYAS
- SMILES: C1CNCCNCCN1

Properties
Chemical formula	C_{6}H_{15}N_{3}
Molar mass	129.2046 g/mol

Hazards
- GHS labelling
Pictograms	(GHS05: Corrosive)
Signal word	Danger
Hazard statements	H314
Precautionary statements	P260, P264, P280, P301+P330+P331, P303+P361+P353, P304+P340, P305+P351+P338, P310, P321, P363, P405, P501
- Except where otherwise noted, data are given for materials in their standard state (at 25 °C [77 °F], 100 kPa). verify (what is ?) Infobox references

1,4,7-Triazacyclononane, known as "TACN" which is pronounced "tack-en," is an aza-crown ether with the formula (C_{2}H_{4}NH)_{3}. TACN is derived, formally speaking, from cyclononane by replacing three equidistant CH_{2} groups with NH groups. TACN is one of the oligomers derived from aziridine, C_{2}H_{4}NH. Other members of the series include piperazine, C_{4}H_{8}(NH)_{2}, and the cyclic tetramer 1,4,7,10-tetraazacyclododecane.

== Synthesis ==
The ligand is prepared from diethylene triamine as follows by macrocyclization using ethyleneglycol ditosylate.

H_{2}NCH_{2}CH_{2}NHCH_{2}CH_{2}NH_{2} + 3 TsCl → Ts(H)NCH_{2}CH_{2}N(Ts)CH_{2}CHH_{2}N(H)Ts + 3 HCl

Ts(H)NCH_{2}CH_{2}N(Ts)CH_{2}CH_{2}N(H)Ts + 2 NaOEt → Ts(Na)NCH_{2}CH_{2}N(Ts)CH_{2}CH_{2}N(Na)Ts

Ts(Na)NCHH_{2}CH_{2}N(Ts)CH_{2}CH_{2}N(Na)Ts + TsOCH_{2}CH_{2}OTs + → [(CH_{2}CH_{2}N(Ts)]_{3} + 2 NaOTs

[(CH_{2}CH_{2}N(Ts)]_{3} + 3 H_{2}O → [CH_{2}CH_{2}NH]_{3} + 3 HOTs

== Coordination chemistry ==
TACN is a popular tridentate ligand. It is threefold symmetric and binds to one face of an octahedron of metalloids and transition metals. The (TACN)M unit is kinetically inert, allowing further synthetic transformations on the other coordination sites. A bulky analogue of TACN, is the N,N′,N″-trimethylated analogue trimethyltriazacyclononane.

=== Illustrative complexes ===
- Although TACN characteristically coordinates to metals in mid- and high oxidation states, e.g. Ni(III), Mn(IV), Mo(III), W(III), exceptions occur. To illustrate, 1,4,7-triazacyclononane reacts readily with Mo(CO)_{6} and W(CO)_{6} to produce the respective air-stable tricarbonyl compounds, [(κ^{3} -TACN)Mo(CO)_{3}] and [(κ^{3}-TACN)W(CO)_{3}]. Both have an oxidation state of zero. After further reacting with 30% H_{2}O_{2}, the products are [(κ^{3}-TACN)MoO_{3}] and [(κ^{3}-TACN)WO_{3}]. Both of these oxo complexes have an oxidation state of 6. The macrocyclic ligand does dissociate in the course of this dramatic change in formal oxidation state of the metal.
- The complex [κ^{3}-TACN)Cu(II)Cl_{2}], a catalyst for hydrolytic cleavage of phosphodiester bonds in DNA, is prepared as follows from TACN trihydrochloride:
  TACN·3HCl + CuCl_{2}·3H_{2}O + 3 NaOH → [(κ^{3}-TACN)CuCl_{2}] + 6 H_{2}O + 3 NaCl
- Mn-TACN complexes catalyze epoxidation of alkenes such as styrene using H_{2}O_{2} as an oxidant in a carbonate buffered methanol solution at a pH of 8.0. These reagents are considered environmentally benign,
  [(κ^{3}-TACN)Mn] + H_{2}O_{2} + NaHCO_{3} + (C_{6}H_{5})C_{2}H_{3}→ [(κ^{3}-TACN)Mn] + 2H_{2}O + CO_{2} + (C_{6}H_{5})C_{2}H_{2}O
- Chromium (II) sources, e.g. created by heating CrCl_{3}^{.}6H_{2}O in DMSO react with TACN to form both 1:1 Cr:and 2:1 complexes, e.g. yellow [(TACN)_{2}Cr]^{3+}.
