= 90Y-DOTA-biotin =

^{90}Y-DOTA-biotin consists of a radioactive substance (yttrium-90) complexed by a chelating agent (DOTA), which in turn is attached to the vitamin biotin via a chemical linker. It is used experimentally in pretargeted radioimmunotherapy. Animal studies have been conducted as well as clinical studies in humans.

In pretargeted radioimmunotherapy, two or three medications are applied in succession. At first, an antibody-drug conjugate is administered, which consists of a monoclonal antibody designed to target the tumour, and a chemical marker which in the case of DOTA-biotin therapy is one of the proteins avidin and streptavidin. After a time of typically one or two days to let the antibody accumulate in the tumour, a clearing agent may be given to eliminate residues of antibody that are still circulating in the bloodstream; this is especially done in humans. After a further waiting time, the radiotherapy (^{90}Y-DOTA-biotin) is administered. Due to the high affinity of biotin to avidin and streptavidin, the radiotherapy accumulates where the antibody is, namely in the tumour, where it delivers its radioactivity.

Example of a ^{90}Y-DOTA-biotin compound. The structure of the linker, as well as its binding position to DOTA, may vary.
