= TCMC =

TCMC may refer to:

- The Commonwealth Medical College, former name of Geisinger Commonwealth School of Medicine
- Tri-City Medical Center, a hospital in Oceanside, California
- TCMC, alternative abbreviation for the chemical DOTAM
- The Twin Cities–Milwaukee–Chicago project, the name used during planning for the Borealis (train)
- Thomson Components – Mostek Corporation (onetime subsidiary of Thomson Semiconducteurs, the semiconductor arm of France’s Thomson-CSF
- Tambaram City Municipal Corporation, Tambaram, Tamil Nadu, India
