= Yttrium (90Y) tacatuzumab tetraxetan =

Monoclonal antibody

Yttrium (^{90}Y) tacatuzumab tetraxetan

Monoclonal antibody
- Type: Whole antibody
- Source: Humanized (from mouse)
- Target: α-fetoprotein

Clinical data
- ATC code: none

Identifiers
- CAS Number: 476413-07-7
- ChemSpider: none
- UNII: GJ2416WK6Y

Chemical and physical data
- Formula: C_{6470}H_{9971}N_{1712}O_{2007}S_{42}^{90}Y
- Molar mass: 145 kg/mol

Yttrium (^{90}Y) tacatuzumab tetraxetan is an investigational humanized monoclonal antibody intended for the treatment of cancer. The antibody itself, tacatuzumab, is conjugated with tetraxetan, a chelator for yttrium-90, a radioisotope which destroys the tumour cells.
