= Cyclam =

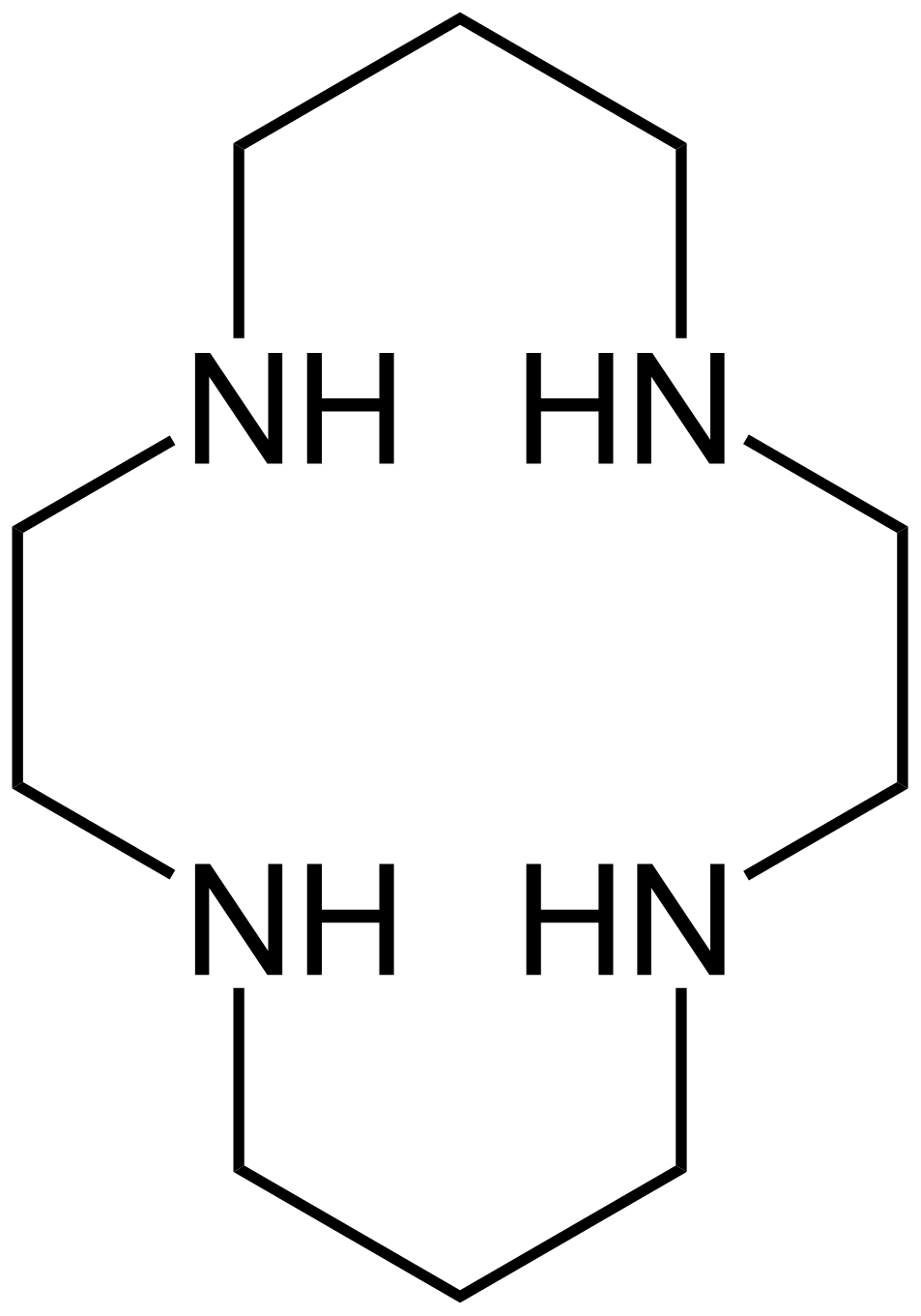

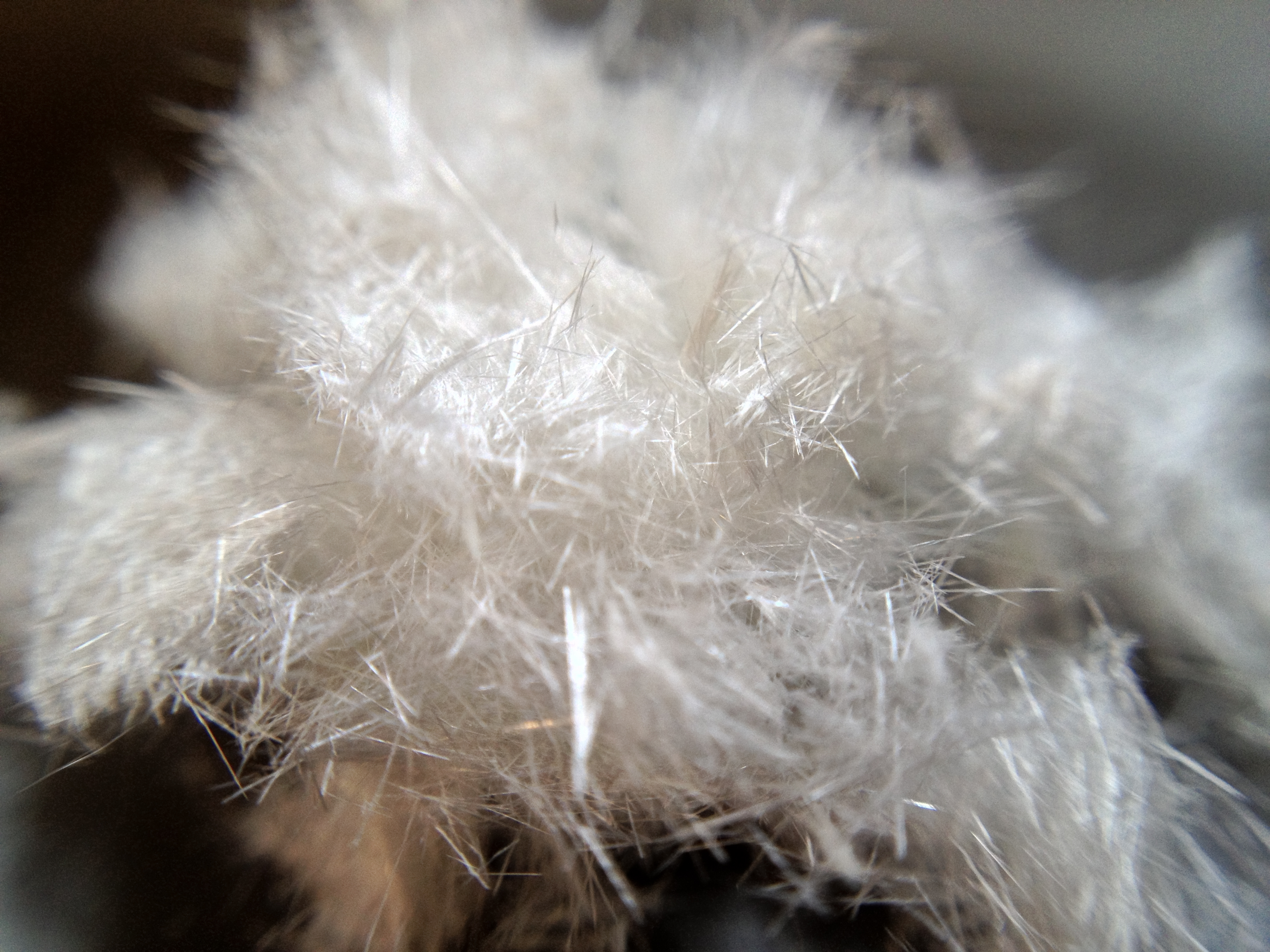

Names
- Preferred IUPAC name 1,4,8,11-Tetraazacyclotetradecane

Identifiers
CAS Number	295-37-4
3D model (JSmol)	Interactive image
ChEBI	CHEBI:37401
ChEMBL	ChEMBL125150
ChemSpider	58489
ECHA InfoCard	100.005.491
PubChem CID	64964
UNII	EP5AZ544VP
CompTox Dashboard (EPA)	DTXSID30183698
- InChI: InChI=1S/C10H24N4/c1-3-11-7-9-13-5-2-6-14-10-8-12-4-1/h11-14H,1-10H2 Key: MDAXKAUIABOHTD-UHFFFAOYSA-N
- SMILES: N1CCNCCCNCCNCCC1

Properties
Chemical formula	C_{10}H_{24}N_{4}
Molar mass	200.330 g·mol^{−1}
Melting point	185 to 188 °C (365 to 370 °F; 458 to 461 K)
Solubility in water	5 g/100 mL (20 °C)
- Except where otherwise noted, data are given for materials in their standard state (at 25 °C [77 °F], 100 kPa). verify (what is ?) Infobox references

Cyclam (1,4,8,11-tetraazacyclotetradecane) is an organic compound with the formula (NHCH_{2}CH_{2}NHCH_{2}CH_{2}CH_{2})_{2}. Classified as an aza-crown ether, it is a white solid that is soluble in water. As a macrocyclic ligand, it binds strongly to many transition metal cations. The compound was first prepared by the reaction of 1,3-dibromopropane and ethylenediamine.

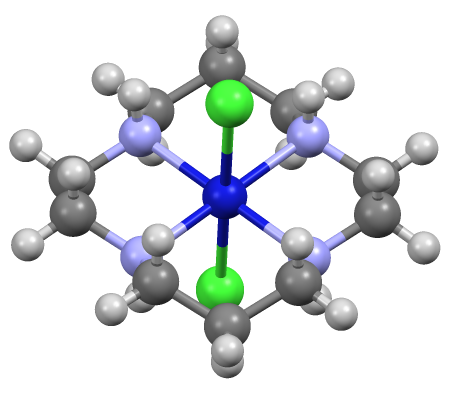
Structure of one isomer of trans-Ni(cyclam)Cl_{2}.

The compound features four secondary amines. Its complexes therefore can exist as several diastereomers, depending on the relative orientation of the N–H centres. Its complexes feature alternating five- and six-membered chelate rings. The closely related ligand cyclen ((CH_{2}CH_{2}NH)_{4}) forms only five-membered C_{2}N_{2}M chelate rings and tends not to form square-planar complexes.

== N-Alkyl derivatives ==
Metal complexes of cyclam are prone to oxidative degradation, which is initiated by deprotonation of the secondary amine. This flaw led to the development of cyclam derivatives wherein the NH centres are replaced by tertiary amines. For example, the tetramethyl derivatives (tetramethylcyclam, tmc) are readily prepared by methylation using formaldehyde and formic acid (Eschweiler–Clarke reaction). These oxidatively robust derivatives of cyclam have enabled a number of metal–O_{2} complexes.

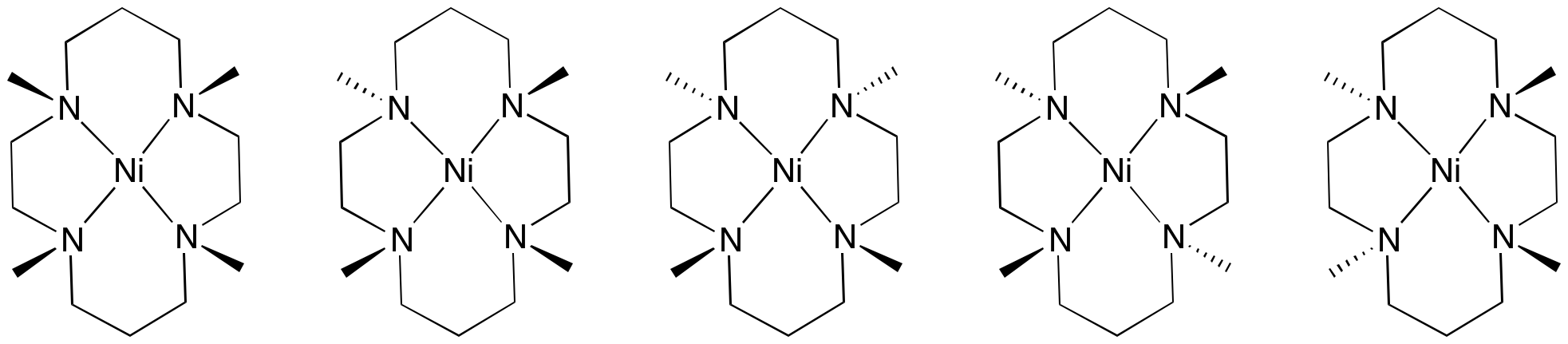
Isomers of a square planar metal cyclam complex.

== See also ==
- Sarcophagine
- Plerixafor
