= 1,4,7-Trimethyl-1,4,7-triazacyclononane =

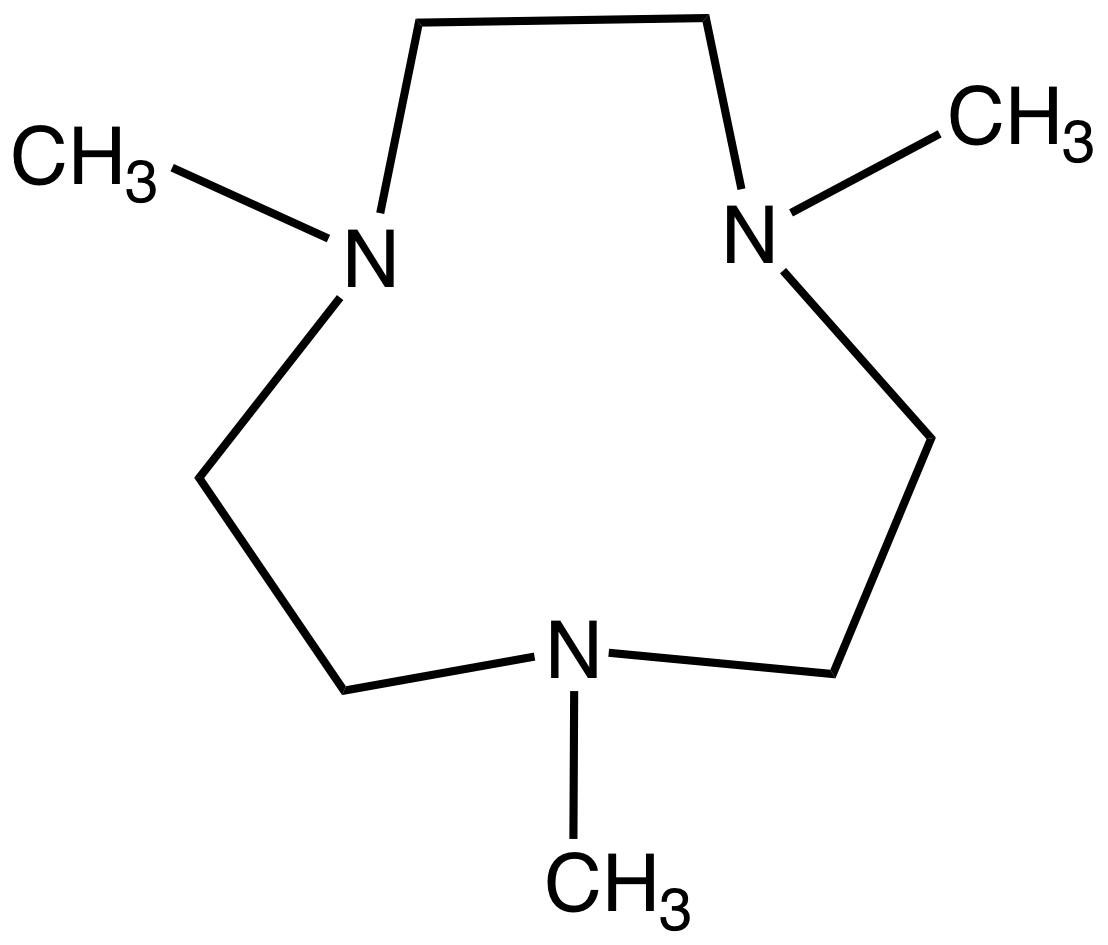

Names
- Preferred IUPAC name 1,4,7-Trimethyl-1,4,7-triazonane
- Other names: Me_{3}TACN; Trimethyltriazacyclononane; N,N′,N′′-Trimethyl-1,4,7-triazacyclononane

Identifiers
CAS Number	96556-05-7
3D model (JSmol)	Interactive image
ChemSpider	476078
ECHA InfoCard	100.119.348
EC Number	619-228-2
PubChem CID	546957
UNII	R7BZK76RTP
CompTox Dashboard (EPA)	DTXSID80338151
- InChI: InChI=1S/C9H21N3/c1-10-4-6-11(2)8-9-12(3)7-5-10/h4-9H2,1-3H3 Key: WLDGDTPNAKWAIR-UHFFFAOYSA-N
- SMILES: CN1CCN(CCN(CC1)C)C

Properties
Chemical formula	C_{9}H_{21}N_{3}
Molar mass	171.288 g·mol^{−1}
Appearance	Colorless oil
Boiling point	207.8 °C (406.0 °F; 480.9 K)

Hazards
- GHS labelling
Pictograms	(GHS05: Corrosive) (GHS07: Exclamation mark)
Signal word	Danger
Hazard statements	H314
Precautionary statements	P260, P264, P270, P280, P301+P312, P301+P330+P331, P303+P361+P353, P304+P340, P305+P351+P338, P310, P321, P330, P363, P405, P501
- Except where otherwise noted, data are given for materials in their standard state (at 25 °C [77 °F], 100 kPa). Infobox references

1,4,7-Trimethyl-1,4,7-triazacyclononane is the aza-crown ether with the formula (CH_{2}CH_{2}NCH_{3})_{3}. This colorless liquid is the N-methylated derivative of triazacyclononane (TACN), a face-capping tridentate ligand that is popular in coordination chemistry.

Although TACN is known for forming 2:1 "sandwich" complexes with many metal ions, corresponding 2:1 complexes of Me_{3}TACN are only known for Ag^{+}, Na^{+}, and K^{+}. This effect is mainly due to the greater bulk of Me_{3}TACN, which requires ions with a larger ionic radius to accommodate two ligands.

Several related derivatives have been prepared with diverse substituents on nitrogen.

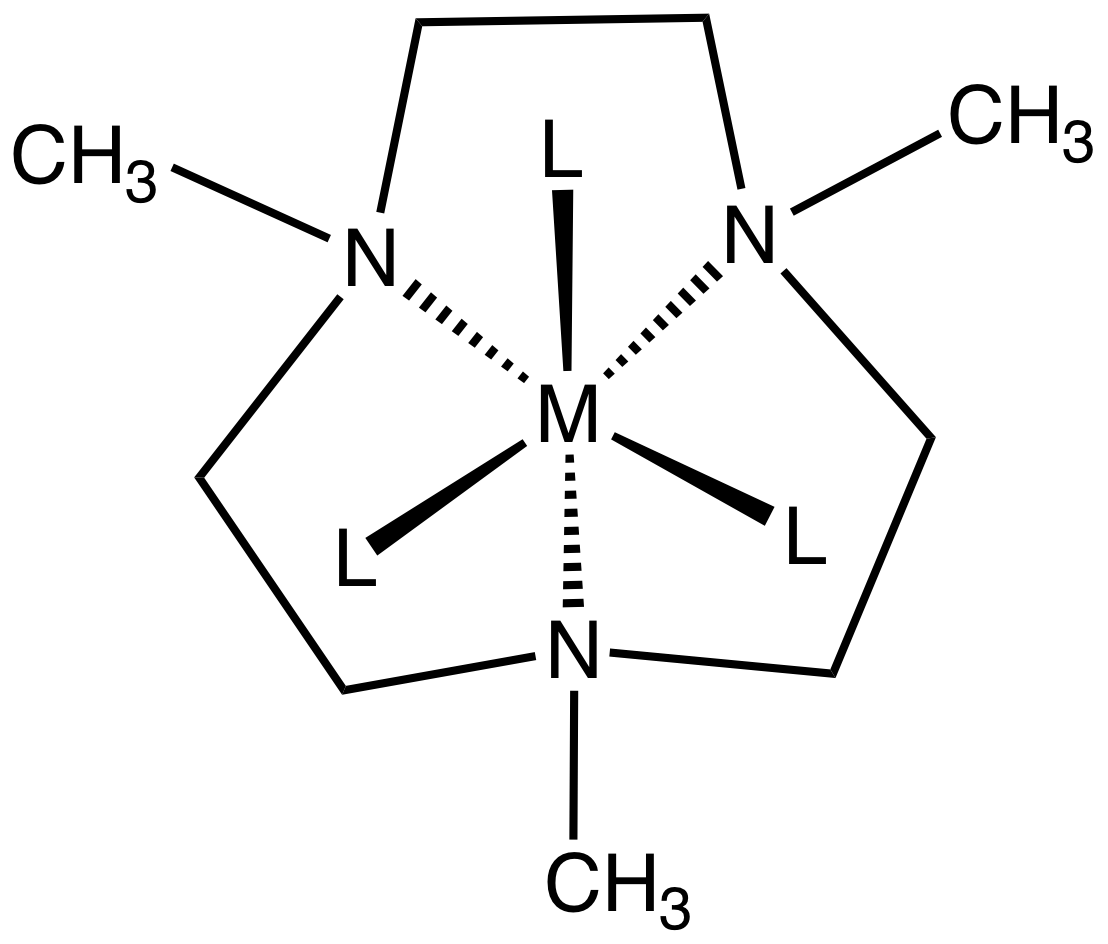
Generic octahedral metal complex of Me_{3}TACN.
