= Sarcophagine =

Names
- Preferred IUPAC name 3,6,10,13,16,19-Hexazabicyclo[6.6.6]icosane
- Other names Sar chelate

Identifiers
| CAS Number | 64189-50-0 |
| 3D model (JSmol) | Interactive image |
| ChemSpider | 4908238 |
| PubChem CID | 6394006 |
| CompTox Dashboard (EPA) | DTXSID30214390 |
- InChI: InChI=1S/C14H32N6/c1-2-16-8-14-11-19-5-3-17-9-13(7-15-1)10-18-4-6-20-12-14/h13-20H,1-12H2 Key: NVOVSXGZALWAFS-UHFFFAOYSA-N
- SMILES: C1CNCC2CNCCNCC(CN1)CNCCNC2

Properties
| Chemical formula | C_{14}H_{32}N_{6} |
| Molar mass | 284.452 g·mol^{−1} |
- Except where otherwise noted, data are given for materials in their standard state (at 25 °C [77 °F], 100 kPa). Infobox references

Sarcophagine (Sar) is a bicyclic cage-like metal chelator molecule derived from cyclam. Chemical name of sarcophagine is 3,6,10,13,16,19-hexaazabicyclo(6,6,6)icosane and additional functional groups are often linked to this structure, such as in DiAmSar (1,8-diamino-Sar). This and many related hexadentate clathrochelates are prepared by template reactions.

Chemical structure of DiAmSar

Sarcophagine derivatives are used, for example, as ligands in radiopharmaceuticals that require incorporating a radioactive metal cation into an organic and/or biological structure, such as an antibody.
