= Aza-crown ether =

Ring molecule with several amine (–N– or >N–) groups

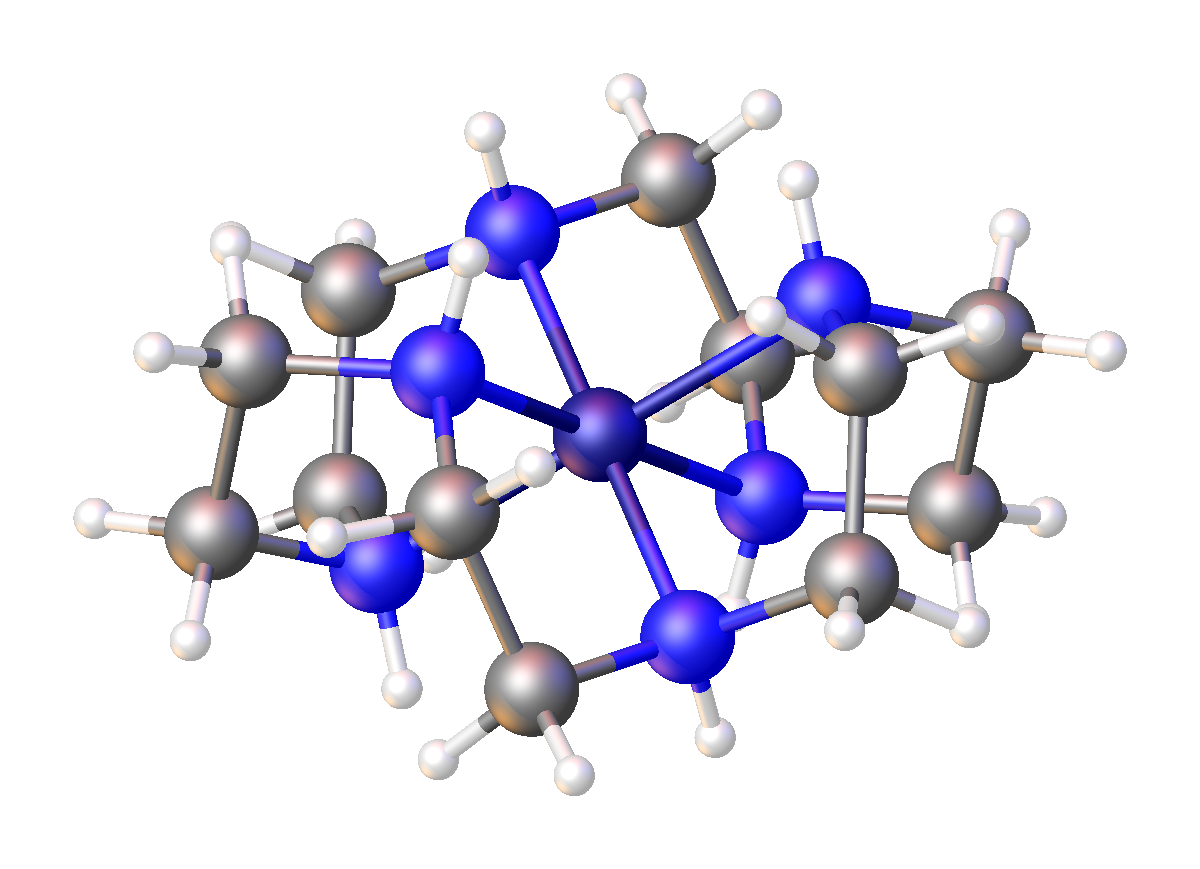
The structure of [Co(III)(CH_{2}CH_{2}NH)_{6}]^{3+}. Color code: blue = N, gray = C, dark blue = Co, white = H.

In organic chemistry, an aza-crown ether is an aza analogue of a crown ether (cyclic polyether). That is, it has a nitrogen atom (amine linkage, −NH− or >N−) in place of each oxygen atom (ether linkage, −O−) around the ring. While the parent crown ethers have the formulae (CH_{2}CH_{2}O)_{n}, the parent aza-crown ethers have the formulae (CH_{2}CH_{2}NH)_{n}, where n = 3, 4, 5, 6. Well-studied aza crowns include triazacyclononane (n = 3), cyclen (n = 4), and hexaaza-18-crown-6 (n = 6).

Selected aza-crowns and their complexes

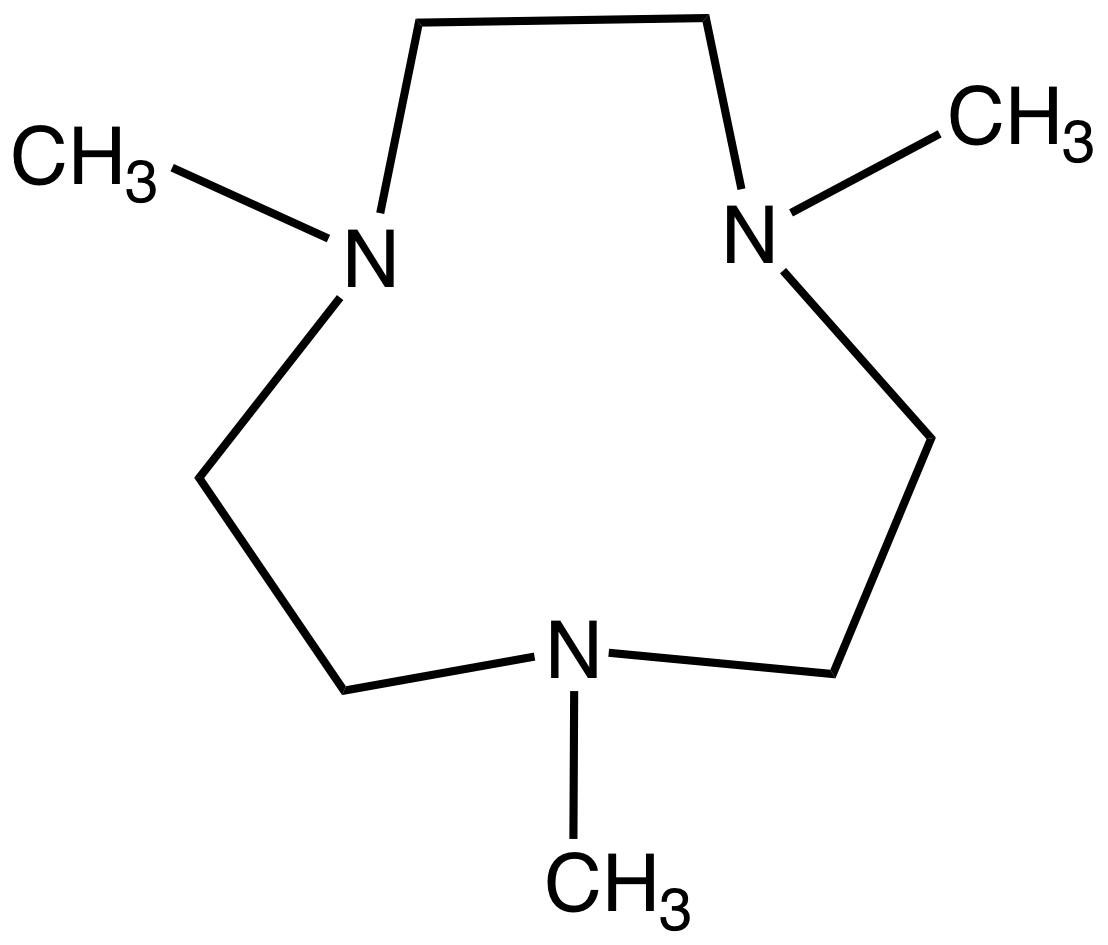
1,4,7-Trimethyl-1,4,7-triazacyclononane, a tridentate ligand used in coordination chemistry.

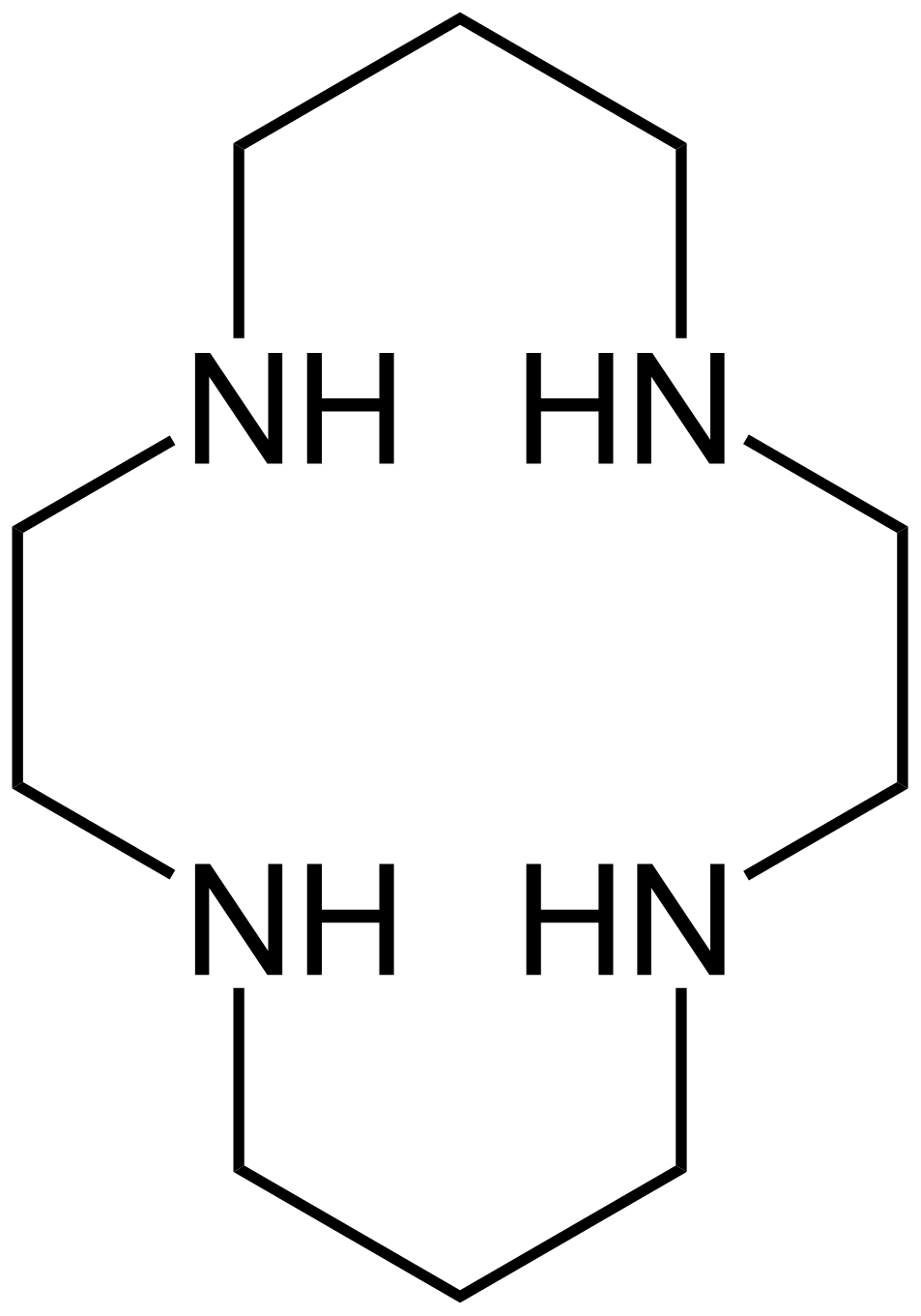
Cyclam is a tetraaza crown ether with alternating (CH_{2})_{2} and (CH_{2})_{3} linkers between amine centers.

Plerixafor, a derivative of cyclam, is used to mobilize blood stem cells as a part of blood cancer treatment.

2.2.2-Cryptand is an aza-crown of the mixed ether-amine variety.

== Synthesis ==
The synthesis of aza crown ethers are subject to the challenges associated with the preparation of macrocycles. The 18-membered ring in (CH_{2}CH_{2}NH)_{6} can be synthesized by combining two triamine components. By reaction with tosyl chloride, diethylene triamine is converted to a derivative with two secondary sulfonamides. This compound serves as a building block for macrocyclizations.

== Variants ==
Many kinds of aza crown ethers exist.

Variable length linkers
Aza crowns often feature trimethylene ((CH_{2})_{3}) as well as ethylene ((CH_{2})_{2}) linkages. One example is cyclam (1,4,8,11-tetraazacyclotetradecane).

Tertiary amines
In many aza-crown ethers some or all of the amines are tertiary. One example is the tri(tertiary amine) (CH_{2}CH_{2}NCH_{3})_{3}, known as trimethyltriazacyclononane. Cryptands, three-dimensional aza crowns, feature tertiary amines.

Mixed ether-amine ligands
Another large class of macrocyclic ligands feature both ether and amines. One example is the diaza-18-crown-6, [(CH_{2}CH_{2}O)_{2}(CH_{2}CH_{2}NH)]_{2}.

Lariat crowns
The presence of the amine allows the formation of Lariat crown ethers, which feature sidearms that augment complexation of cation.
