= Hexaaza-18-crown-6 =

Names
- Preferred IUPAC name 1,4,7,10,13,16-Hexaazacyclooctadecane
- Other names hexacyclen

Identifiers
CAS Number	296-35-5
3D model (JSmol)	Interactive image
ChemSpider	38121
ECHA InfoCard	100.005.494
EC Number	206-042-8
PubChem CID	41779
CompTox Dashboard (EPA)	DTXSID70183778
- InChI: InChI=1S/C12H30N6/c1-2-14-5-6-16-9-10-18-12-11-17-8-7-15-4-3-13-1/h13-18H,1-12H2 Key: RVJABZUDCPZPPM-UHFFFAOYSA-N
- SMILES: C1CNCCNCCNCCNCCNCCN1

Properties
Chemical formula	C_{12}H_{30}N_{6}
Molar mass	258.414 g·mol^{−1}
Appearance	white solid
Melting point	201 °C (394 °F; 474 K)

Hazards
- GHS labelling
Pictograms	(GHS07: Exclamation mark)
Signal word	Warning
Hazard statements	H315, H319
Precautionary statements	P264, P280, P302+P352, P305+P351+P338, P321, P332+P313, P337+P313, P362
- Except where otherwise noted, data are given for materials in their standard state (at 25 °C [77 °F], 100 kPa). Infobox references

Hexaaza-18-crown-6 is the macrocyclic ligand with the formula (CH_{2}CH_{2}NH)_{6}. A white solid, this compound has attracted attention as the N6-analogue of 18-crown-6. It functions as a hexadentate ligand in coordination chemistry. It is the parent hexaaza-crown ether.

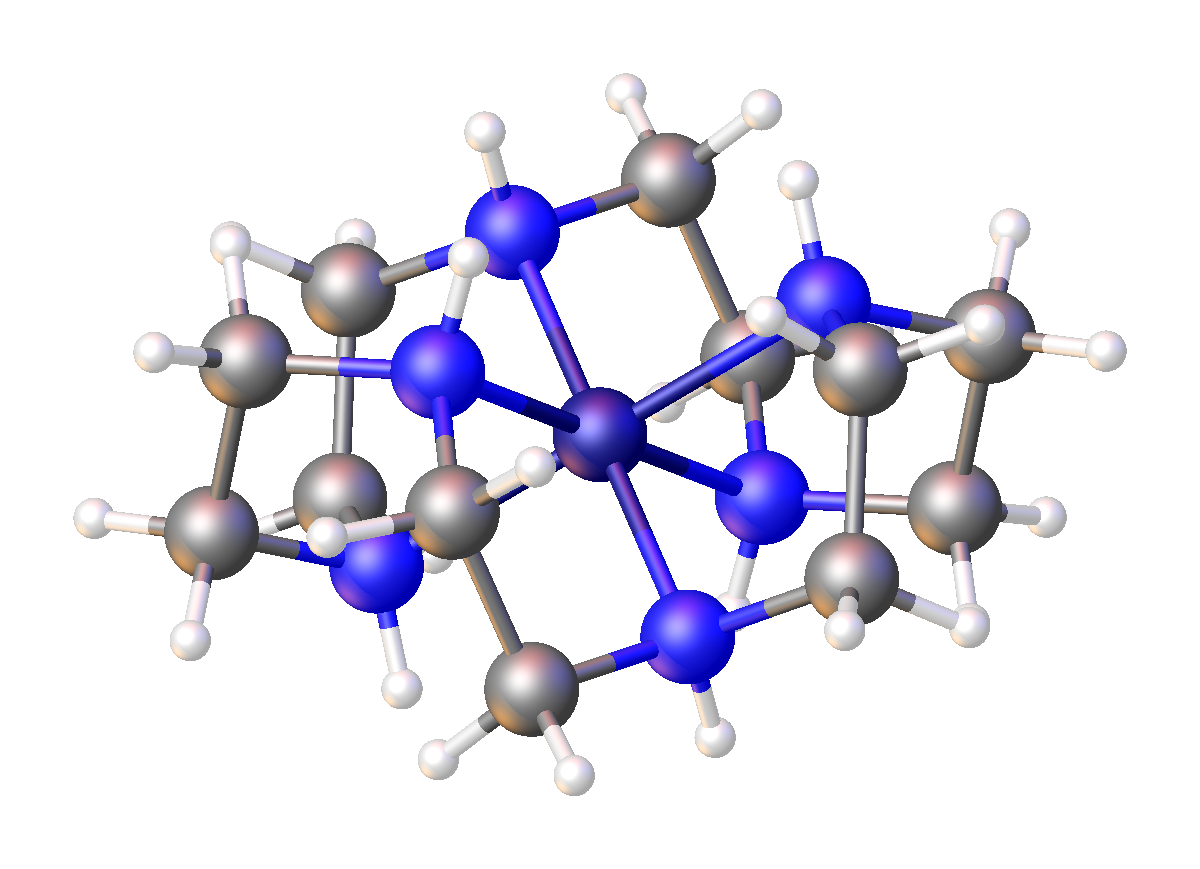
Structure of [Co(III)(hexaaza-18-crown-6)]^{3+}.

Its protonated derivatives bind anions via multiple hydrogen bonds.
