= Dithiooxamide =

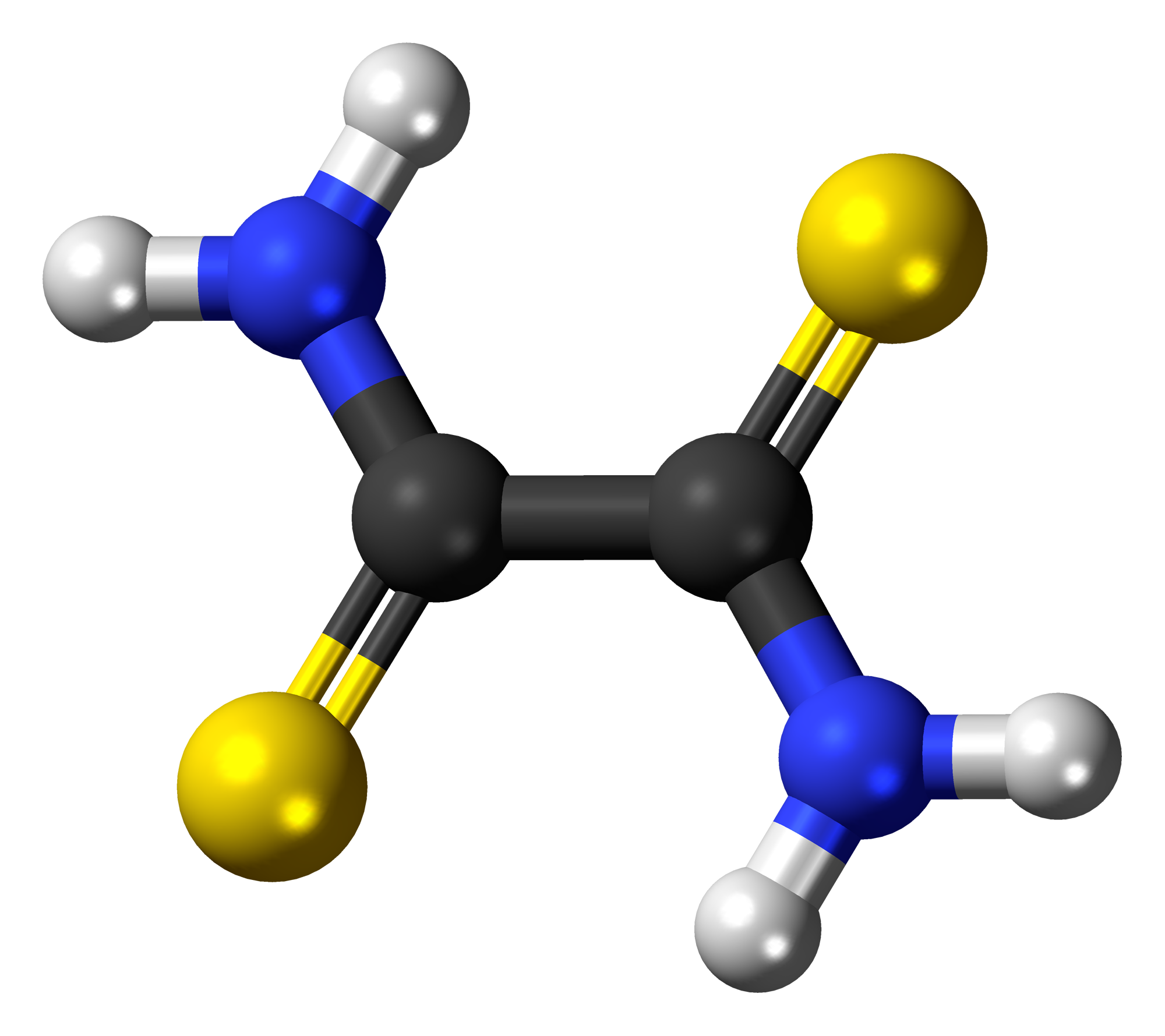

Names
- Preferred IUPAC name Ethanedithioamide
- Other names dithiooxamide, rubeanic acid

Identifiers
| CAS Number | 79-40-3 |
| 3D model (JSmol) | Interactive image |
| ChemSpider | 2058248 |
| ECHA InfoCard | 100.001.095 |
| PubChem CID | 2777982 |
| UNII | HE28T8Z08D |
| CompTox Dashboard (EPA) | DTXSID3020546 |
- InChI: InChI=1S/C2H4N2S2/c3-1(5)2(4)6/h(H2,3,5)(H2,4,6) Key: OAEGRYMCJYIXQT-UHFFFAOYSA-N; InChI=1/C2H4N2S2/c3-1(5)2(4)6/h(H2,3,5)(H2,4,6) Key: OAEGRYMCJYIXQT-UHFFFAOYAT
- SMILES: S=C(N)C(=S)N

Properties
| Chemical formula | C_{2}H_{4}N_{2}S_{2} |
| Molar mass | 120.19 g·mol^{−1} |
| Density | 1.523 g/cm^{3} |
| Melting point | 170 °C (338 °F; 443 K) decomp |

Hazards
- GHS labelling
| Pictograms | (GHS07: Exclamation mark) |
| Signal word | Warning |
| Hazard statements | H302, H315, H319, H335 |
| Precautionary statements | P261, P264, P270, P271, P280, P301+P312, P302+P352, P304+P340, P305+P351+P338, P312, P321, P330, P332+P313, P337+P313, P362, P403+P233, P405, P501 |
| Safety data sheet (SDS) | External MSDS |
- Except where otherwise noted, data are given for materials in their standard state (at 25 °C [77 °F], 100 kPa). verify (what is ?) Infobox references

Dithiooxamide, also known as rubeanic acid, is an organic compound. It is the sulfur analog of oxamide. It acts as a chelating agent, e.g. in the detection or determination of copper. It has also been used as a building block in the synthesis of cyclen.

== Materials chemistry ==
Rubeanic acid has received much attention as a precursor to photonic or electroactive materials. It is a precursor to inorganic C-S-N rings. It condenses with acid chlorides to thiazoles. It forms coordination polymers.
