= DOTA (chelator) =

- DOTA

Names
- Preferred IUPAC name 2,2′,2″,2‴-(1,4,7,10-Tetraazacyclododecane-1,4,7,10-tetrayl)tetraacetic acid
- Other names DotA; Tetraxetan

Identifiers
| CAS Number | 60239-18-1 |
| 3D model (JSmol) | Interactive image; Interactive image |
| ChEBI | CHEBI:61028 |
| ChemSpider | 108701 |
| ECHA InfoCard | 100.113.833 |
| IUPHAR/BPS | 5538 |
| PubChem CID | 121841 |
| UNII | 1HTE449DGZ |
| CompTox Dashboard (EPA) | DTXSID60208984 |
- InChI: InChI=1S/C16H28N4O8/c21-13(22)9-17-1-2-18(10-14(23)24)5-6-20(12-16(27)28)8-7-19(4-3-17)11-15(25)26/h1-12H2,(H,21,22)(H,23,24)(H,25,26)(H,27,28) Key: WDLRUFUQRNWCPK-UHFFFAOYSA-N; InChI=1/C16H28N4O8/c21-13(22)9-17-1-2-18(10-14(23)24)5-6-20(12-16(27)28)8-7-19(4-3-17)11-15(25)26/h1-12H2,(H,21,22)(H,23,24)(H,25,26)(H,27,28) Key: WDLRUFUQRNWCPK-UHFFFAOYAO
- SMILES: O=C(O)CN(CC1)CCN(CC(=O)O)CCN(CC(=O)O)CCN1CC(=O)O; C1CN(CCN(CCN(CCN1CC(=O)O)CC(=O)O)CC(=O)O)CC(=O)O

Properties
| Chemical formula | C_{16}H_{28}N_{4}O_{8} |
| Molar mass | 404.420 g·mol^{−1} |
| Appearance | White crystalline solid |

Hazards
- GHS labelling
| Pictograms | (GHS07: Exclamation mark) |
| Signal word | Warning |
| Hazard statements | H315, H319, H335 |
| Precautionary statements | P261, P305+P351+P338 |

Related compounds
| Related compounds | Cyclen, EDTA |
- Except where otherwise noted, data are given for materials in their standard state (at 25 °C [77 °F], 100 kPa). verify (what is ?) Infobox references

DOTA (also known as tetraxetan) is an organic compound with the formula (CH_{2}CH_{2}NCH_{2}CO_{2}H)_{4}. The molecule consists of a central 12-membered tetraaza (containing four nitrogen atoms) ring. DOTA is used as a complexing agent, especially for lanthanide ions. Its complexes have medical applications as contrast agents and cancer treatments.

== Terminology ==
The acronym DOTA (for dodecane tetraacetic acid) is shorthand for both the tetracarboxylic acid and its various conjugate bases. In the area of coordination chemistry, the tetraacid is called H_{4}DOTA and its fully deprotonated derivative is DOTA^{4−}. Many related ligands are referred to using the DOTA acronym, although these derivatives are generally not tetracarboxylic acids or the conjugate bases.

The "tetra-" prefix in tetraxetan indicates the four nitrogen atoms in the macrocycle and the four acetic acid arms in the DOTA structure, while "xetan" is a standard suffix for chelators.

== Structure ==
DOTA is derived from the macrocycle known as cyclen. The four secondary amine groups are modified by replacement of the N−H centers with N−CH_{2}CO_{2}H groups. The resulting aminopolycarboxylic acid, upon ionization of the carboxylic acid groups, is a high affinity chelating agent for di- and trivalent cations. The tetracarboxylic acid was first reported in 1976. At the time of its discovery DOTA exhibited the largest known formation constant for the complexation (chelating) of Ca^{2+} and Gd^{3+} ions. Modified versions of DOTA were first reported in 1988 and this area has proliferated since.

As a polydentate ligand, DOTA envelops metal cations, but the denticity of the ligand depends on the geometric tendencies of the metal cation. The main applications involve the lanthanides and in such complexes DOTA functions as an octadentate ligand, binding the metal through four amine and four carboxylate groups. Most such complexes feature an additional water ligand, giving an overall coordination number of nine.

For most transition metals, DOTA functions as a hexadentate ligand, binding through the four nitrogen and two carboxylate centres. The complexes have octahedral coordination geometry, with two pendent carboxylate groups. In the case of [Fe(DOTA)]^{−}, the ligand is heptadentate.

== Uses ==
=== Cancer treatment and diagnosis ===
DOTA can be conjugated to monoclonal antibodies by attachment of one of the four carboxyl groups as an amide. The remaining three carboxylate anions are available for binding to the yttrium ion. The modified antibody accumulates in the tumour cells, concentrating the effects of the radioactivity of ^{90}Y. Drugs containing this module receive an International Nonproprietary Name ending in tetraxetan:

- Yttrium (^{90}Y) clivatuzumab tetraxetan
- Yttrium (^{90}Y) tacatuzumab tetraxetan

DOTA can also be linked to molecules that have affinity for various structures. The resulting compounds are used with a number of radioisotopes in cancer therapy and diagnosis (for example in positron emission tomography).

- Affinity for somatostatin receptors, which are found on neuroendocrine tumours:
  - DOTATOC, DOTA-(Tyr^{3})-octreotide or edotreotide
  - DOTA-TATE or DOTA-(Tyr^{3})-octreotate
- Affinity for the proteins streptavidin and avidin, which can be targeted at tumours by aid of monoclonal antibodies:
  - DOTA-biotin
DOTA linked to the monoclonal antibody tacatuzumab and chelating yttrium-90

DOTATOC chelating yttrium-90

DOTA-TATE

=== Contrast agent ===
The complex of Gd^{3+} and DOTA is used as a gadolinium-based MRI contrast agent under the name gadoteric acid.

== Synthesis ==
DOTA was first synthesized in 1976 from cyclen and bromoacetic acid. This method is simple and still in use.
