= Cyclen =

Names
- Preferred IUPAC name 1,4,7,10-Tetrazacyclododecane
- Other names Tetraaza-12-crown-4 [12]aneN₄

Identifiers
CAS Number	294-90-6
3D model (JSmol)	Interactive image; Interactive image
ChEBI	CHEBI:37391
ChEMBL	ChEMBL19880
ChemSpider	58488
ECHA InfoCard	100.102.391
PubChem CID	64963
UNII	964584YO2O
CompTox Dashboard (EPA)	DTXSID60183621
- InChI: InChI=1S/C8H20N4/c1-2-10-5-6-12-8-7-11-4-3-9-1/h9-12H,1-8H2 Key: QBPPRVHXOZRESW-UHFFFAOYSA-N; InChI=1/C8H20N4/c1-2-10-5-6-12-8-7-11-4-3-9-1/h9-12H,1-8H2 Key: QBPPRVHXOZRESW-UHFFFAOYAQ
- SMILES: N1CCNCCNCCNCC1; C1CNCCNCCNCCN1

Properties
Chemical formula	C_{8}H_{20}N_{4}
Molar mass	172.276 g·mol^{−1}
Appearance	White solid
Melting point	110–113 °C (230–235 °F; 383–386 K)
- Except where otherwise noted, data are given for materials in their standard state (at 25 °C [77 °F], 100 kPa). verify (what is ?) Infobox references

Cyclen (1,4,7,10-tetraazacyclododecane) is an aza-crown ether with the formula (CH_{2}CH_{2}NH)_{4}. It is a white solid. It forms coordination complexes with metal cations and is used to synthesize the chelating agent DOTA which has several medical applications. Being structurally simple, symmetrical, and polyfunctional, cyclen has been widely investigated.

== Synthesis ==
Some syntheses exploit the Thorpe-Ingold effect to facilitate ring-formation. Illustrative is the reaction of the deprotonated tosylamides with ditosylates:

TsN(CH_{2}CH_{2}NTsNa)_{2} + TsN(CH_{2}CH_{2}OTs)_{2} → (TsNCH_{2}CH_{2})_{4}

The resulting macrocycle can be deprotected with strong acid. Base gives the tetramine.

High dilution conditions result in a low reaction rate penalty and this disadvantage is removed in an alternative procedure starting from triethylenetetraamine and dithiooxamide to a bisamidine – also a bis(imidazoline) – followed by reduction and ring expansion with DIBAL.

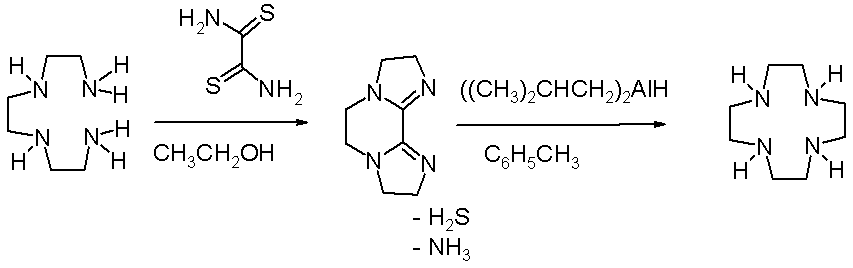

== Coordination complexes ==
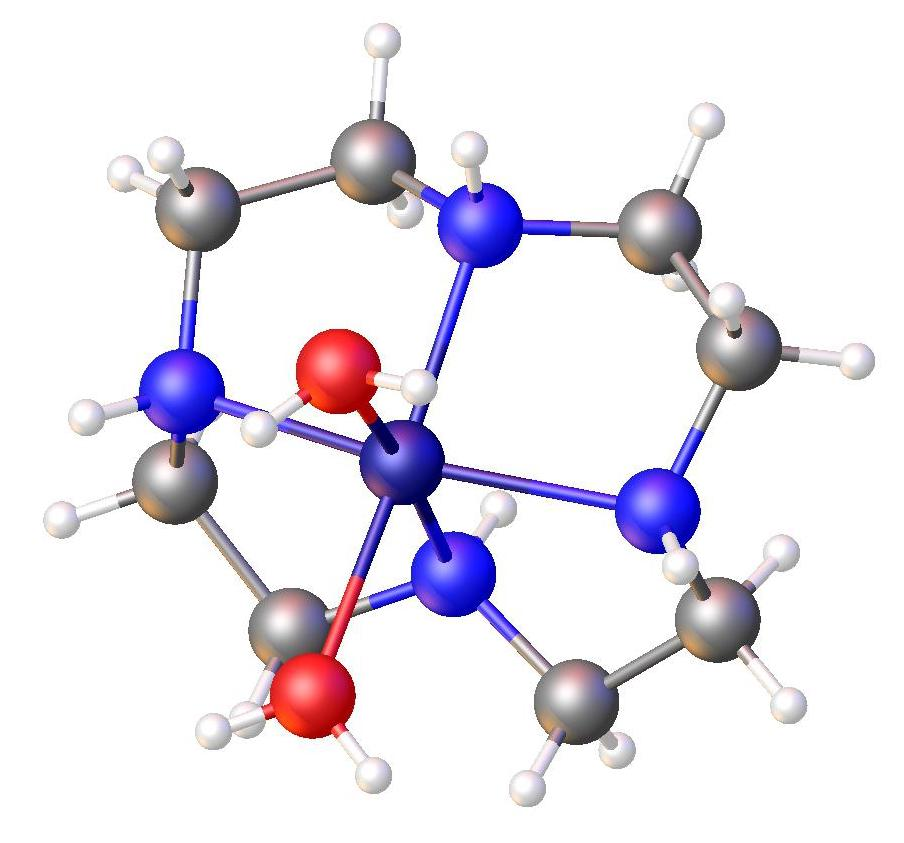
Structure of [Ni(cyclen)(OH_{2})_{2}]^{2+}. Color code: O = red, N = blue, Ni = dark blue, white = H, gray = C.

Coordination complexes of cyclen have been studied extensively. With a 12-membered C8N4 ring, it tends to bind to four contiguous sites on octahedral metal centers, forming four 5-membered chelate rings (see figure). Cyclen also forms "bis complexes", e.g. of the type [Ln(cyclen)_{2}]^{3+} where Ln = lanthanide.

== Related compounds ==
- The cyclam ligands are also tetraaza macrocycles but consist of a more flexible C_{10}N_{4} ring.
