= Yttrium-90 =

Radioactive isotope of yttrium

General
- Symbol: ^{90}Y
- Names: yttrium-90
- Protons (Z): 39
- Neutrons (N): 51

Nuclide data
- Half-life (t_{1/2}): 64.05±0.05 h

Yttrium-90 (^{90}Y) is a radioactive isotope of yttrium. Yttrium-90 has found a wide range of uses in radiation therapy to treat some forms of cancer. It is sometimes called radioyttrium (as might be other radioisotopes of the element).

== Decay ==
^{90}Y undergoes β^{−} decay to zirconium-90 with a half-life of 64.05 hours and a decay energy of 2.28 MeV with an average beta energy of 0.9336 MeV. Although it decays to the 1.7 MeV excited 0^{+} state of ^{90}Zr with frequency more than 0.01%, emission of a gamma ray is forbidden and the normal decay of that state is internal conversion; the alternative of pair production has been the subject of study for potential use, despite its rarity. The useful photons emitted through this isotope's decay are instead bremsstrahlung X-rays.

== Production ==
Yttrium-90 is produced by the nuclear decay of strontium-90 which has a half-life of nearly 29 years and is a fission product of uranium used in nuclear reactors. As the strontium-90 decays, chemical high-purity separation is used to isolate the yttrium-90 before precipitation. Yttrium-90 is also directly produced by neutron activation of natural yttrium (^{89}Y) targets in a nuclear research reactor.

== Medical application ==
^{90}Y plays a significant role in the treatment of hepatocellular carcinoma (HCC), leukemia, and lymphoma, although it has the potential to treat a range of tumors. Trans-arterial radioembolization is a procedure performed by interventional radiologists, in which ^{90}Y microspheres are injected into the arteries supplying the tumor. The microspheres come in two forms: resin, in which ^{90}Y is bound to the surface, and glass, in which ^{90}Y is directly incorporated into the microsphere during production. Once injected, the microspheres become lodged in blood vessels surrounding the tumor and the resulting radiation damages the nearby tissue. The distribution of the microspheres is dependent on several factors, including catheter tip positioning, distance to branching vessels, rate of injection, properties of particles, like size and density, and variability in tumor perfusion. Radioembolization with ^{90}Y significantly prolongs time-to-progression (TTP) of HCC, has a tolerable adverse event profile, and improves patient quality of life more than do similar therapies. ^{90}Y has also found uses in tumor diagnosis by imaging the Bremsstrahlung radiation released by the microspheres. Positron emission tomography after radioembolization is also possible.

== Post-treatment imaging ==
Following treatment with ^{90}Y, imaging is performed to evaluate ^{90}Y delivery and absorption to evaluate coverage of target regions and involvement of normal tissue. This is typically performed using Bremsstrahlung imaging with single-photon emission computed tomography CT (SPECT/CT), or using ^{90}Y position imaging with positron emission tomography CT (PET/CT).

=== Bremsstrahlung imaging after ^{90}Y therapy ===
As ^{90}Y undergoes beta decay, broad spectrum bremsstrahlung radiation is emitted and is detectable with standard gamma cameras or SPECT. These modalities provide information about radioactive uptake of ^{90}Y, however, there is poor spatial information. Consequently, it is challenging to delineate anatomy and thereby evaluate tumor and normal tissue uptake. This led to the development of SPECT/CT, which combines the functional information of SPECT with the spatial information of CT to allow for more accurate ^{90}Y localization.

=== Positron imaging after ^{90}Y therapy ===
PET/CT and PET/MRI have superior spatial resolution compared to SPECT/CT because PET detects photon pairs produced from the annihilation of emitted positrons with electrons in nearby tissue, negating the requirement for a physical collimator. This allows for better assessment of microsphere distribution and dose absorption. However, both PET/CT and PET/MRI are less widely available and more costly.

== See also ==
- Radionuclide therapy
- Selective internal radiation therapy
