= Fluoroantimonate =

Chemical compound

The fluoroantimonates are a family of polyatomic weakly coordinating anions composed of antimony and fluorine, consisting of the fluorine adducts of antimony pentafluoride, [(SbF_{5})_{n}F]^{−}. They occur in the internal chemistry of fluoroantimonic acid.

The most notable fluoroantimonates are hexafluoroantimonate [SbF_{6}]^{−} and undecafluorodiantimonate [Sb_{2}F_{11}]^{−}. Both are used as components of ionic liquids and as weakly coordinating anions in the study of highly reactive cations.

== Properties ==
Hexafluoroantimonate is the conjugate base of the superacid fluoroantimonic acid HF·SbF_{5}. As fluoroantimonic acid is one of the strongest known acids (only weaker than the helium hydride ion and potentially some carborane acids), hexafluoroantimonate is one of the weakest known bases.

Higher fluoroantimonates are believed to be even less basic.

== Synthesis ==
Fluoroantimonates result from the fluorination of antimony pentafluoride. SbF_{5} is an extremely strong Lewis acid, especially towards fluoride sources.

=== In fluoroantimonic acid ===
In solutions of fluoroantimonic acid, the extreme Lewis acidity of SbF_{5} towards fluoride overcomes the very low basicity of hydrogen fluoride and strips it of its bonding electrons and fluoride. This forces HF to act as a Brønsted–Lowry base, producing the solvated protons which account for the mixture's superacidity:

2 HF + SbF_{5} ⇌ [H_{2}F]^{+} [SbF_{6}]^{−}

While fluoroantimonic acid is often depicted according to the above - roughly analogous to the autooxidation of water into hydronium and hydroxide - this reaction is an oversimplification. In addition to reacting with hydrogen fluoride, excess SbF_{5} is also capable of forming Lewis adducts with fluoroantimonates, yielding a higher fluoroantimonate:

SbF_{5} + [SbF_{6}]^{−} ⇌ [Sb_{2}F_{11}]^{−}

As fluoroantimonic acid is often mixed in a 1:1 ratio, [Sb_{2}F_{11}]^{−} is the dominant anion in the solution. Further, solvated protons are not limited to [H_{2}F]^{+}, and can form heavier cations such as [H_{3}F_{2}]^{+} or [H_{4}F_{3}]^{+}, leaving more SbF_{5} to react and form higher fluoroantimonate ions.

=== As salts ===
Fluoroantimonates may be crystallised from a solution of fluoroantimonic acid with some cation. The most common salts are of [SbF_{6}]^{−}, but salts of [Sb_{2}F_{11}]^{−} and [Sb_{4}F_{21}]^{−} have been isolated in the laboratory.

As fluoroantimonic acid and antimony pentafluoride are highly reactive, other routes to fluoroantimonates are industrially desirable. Fluorination of antimonate and of antimony trioxide (with hydrogen peroxide as an oxidant) with HF as a solvent can yield fluoroantimonates from metal fluoride salts.

== Applications ==
As weakly coordinating anions, fluoroantimonates can be used to study highly reactive cations.

The reaction of SbF_{5} with bromofluorocarbons produces bromonium hexafluoroantimonates, which are stable in sulfur dioxide solution. George Olah's work with this reaction established experimental evidence for halonium ions, which had been theoretically predicted to explain the regioselectivity of halogen addition reactions.

Other cations isolated as fluoroantimonates include hydronium (crystallised from magic acid as the undecafluorodiantimonate), fluoronium (directly crystallised from fluoroantimonic acid as the undecafluorodiantimonate), noble gas-noble metal cations such as tetraxenonogold(II) (as the undecafluorodiantimonate) and xenonomercury(II) (as a mixed salt of hexafluoroantimonate and undecafluoroantimonate), and derivatives or complexes of platinum group metals.

Fluoroantimonate is also a component of ionic liquids used in catalysis.
