= Organogermanium compounds in cross-coupling reactions =

Organogermanium compounds refers to a type of cross-coupling reaction where one of the coupling partners is an organogermanium compound. Usually, these reactions are catalyzed by transition metal complexes.

== History ==
The first example of organogermanes used in transition-metal-catalyzed cross-coupling reaction was reported in 2004. However, due to the toxicity, low reactivity (compared with other Ar–[M] nucleophiles) and poor stability of ArGeCl_{3}, this reaction was demonstrated not to be synthetically applicable.

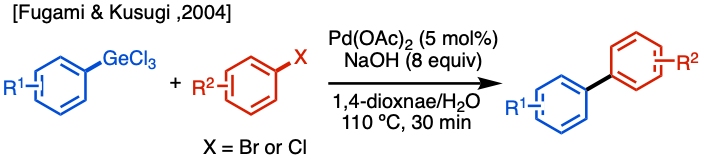

After that, various organogermanes were designed to increase their robustness and decrease their toxicity. However, most of them are not trivial to synthesize and have the least reactivity in Pd(0)/Pd(II) catalytic system. As a result, these organogermanes have limited utilization in organic synthesis.

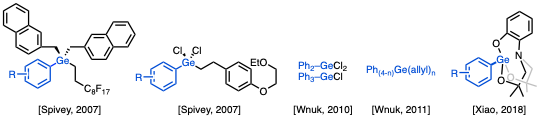

A stoichiometric study by Schoenebeck confirmed that ArGeEt_{3} are inert species in the transmetallation step with Pd(II) complex. DFT calculation indicated that the conventional concerted transmetallation mechanism has an extremely high energy barrier and not viable under the reaction conditions. Instead, electrophilic aromatic substitution (S_{E}Ar)-type pathway is kinetically more favored to activate C–Ge bonds.

Based on this concept, if the transition metal catalyst is electron-deficient or electrophilic enough, the activation of C–Ge bond can be achievable via S_{E}Ar mechanism. And due to this unique reactivity, the transformations of organogermanes can exhibit excellent chemoselectivity and tolerate other reactive functional groups, which can provide a platform to functionalize different groups orthogonally.

== Pd-catalyzed cross-coupling reactions ==
Highly electrophilic cationic Pd nanoparticle can activate the C–Ge bond of ArGeEt_{3}. The Pd nanoparticle is exclusively reactive towards organogermanes with aryl iodides (ArI) or aryl iodonium salts (Ar_{2}I^{+}) as electrophilic coupling partners. Other cross-coupling-reactive functional groups, such as other (psudo)halides, aryl boronic esters, stayed intact during the reaction. In comparison, under traditional Pd(0)-catalyzed cross-coupling conditions, ArGeEt_{3} are inert while aryl boronic acids/esters are reactive. Besides, ArGeEt_{3} bearing electron-deficient aryl groups, whose aryl boronic acid analogues are highly unstable, have excellent stability instead, allowing the use of them as nucleophiles in cross-coupling reactions.

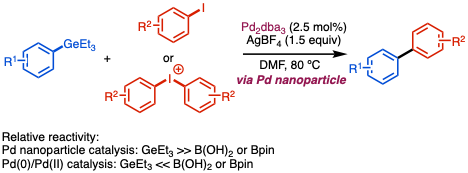

Pd(TFA)_{2} is another reactive catalyst for transmetallation of ArGeEt_{3}. It has an electron-deficient Pd center and provides thermodynamic driving force by forming TFA–GeEt_{3}. Based on this strategy, an oxidative C–O cross-coupling method catalyzed by Pd(TFA)_{2} was reported. The reaction proceeded through a Pd(II)/Pd(IV) catalytic cycle. Similarly, other reactive functional groups for cross-coupling such as (pseudo)halides and boronic esters are well tolerated.

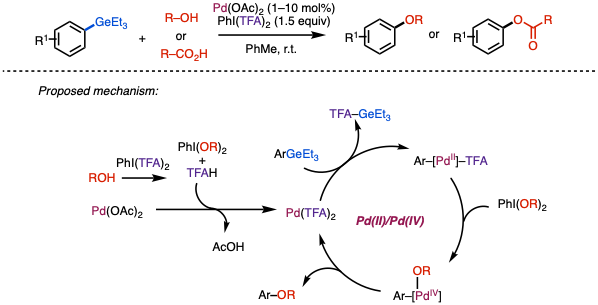

== Au-catalyzed cross-coupling reactions ==
In addition to Pd nanoparticle and Pd(TFA)_{2}, other electron-deficient transition-metal complexes, such as Au(III) or cationic Au(I) complexes, are reactive for C–Ge bond activation to give aryl gold (Ar–Au) as transmetallation intermediate. Merging this reactivity with C(aryl)–H activation or photo-induced oxidative addition of ArN_{2}BF_{4} with gold catalysts, C(aryl)–H functionalization or C(aryl)–C(aryl) cross-coupling can be realized via Au(I)/Au(III) catalytic cycle. Under the employed conditions, ArGeEt_{3} are more reactive compared with its aryl silane or boronic ester analogues. Additionally, gold complexes are unreactive with oxidative addition with (pseudo)halides. In conclusion, these reactions also showed great orthogonal reactivity with different reactive functional groups.

Au-catalyzed C(aryl)–C(alkynyl) cross-coupling was reported with alkynyl germanes as nucleophiles and ArN_{2}BF_{4} as coupling partners under photoirradiation condition. Not surprisingly, this method showed orthogonality against Sonogashira Coupling.

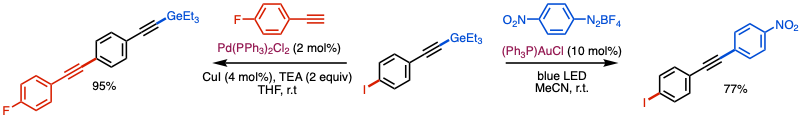

== Organogermanes in transition-metal-free reactions ==
=== Ipso halogenation ===
ArGeEt_{3} can react with electrophilic halogen sources without transition-metal catalysts to give ipso halogenation product under mild conditions. For the bromination (with NBS) and iodination (with NIS), the reaction is highly chemoselective, with halogenation solely taking place at C–Ge in presence of electron-rich arene, heterocycle substrates or other reactive functional groups. The mechanistic study supports a concerted S_{E}Ar-type pathway.

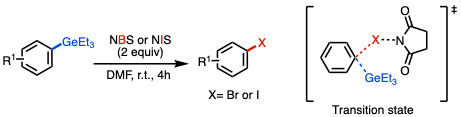

Aryl germanes are stable against selectfluor. The electrophilic fluorination will selectively place at the –Bu_{3}Sn site in presence of –GeEt_{3}. Other Ar–M species, such as aryl boronic acids/esters and silanes, cannot stay intact under this condition.

Based on its unique reactivity, organogermanes can be viewed as masked halides in organic synthesis, which enables the modular synthesis of polyarenes.

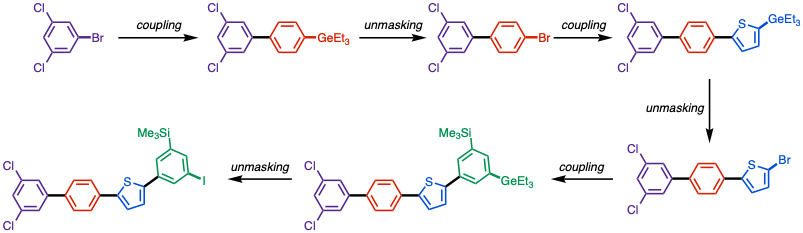

=== Giese-type reaction ===
C–Ge bonds of alkyl germanes can be homolyzed by photoirradiation, generating alkyl radical, which can be captured by electron-deficient alkenes. This Giese-type reaction has excellent orthogonal selectivity. Reactive functional groups such as halides, boronic esters can be well tolerated.

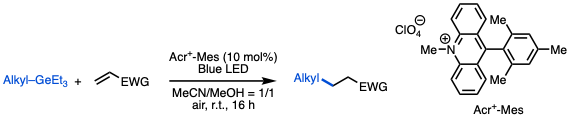

=== Miscellaneous Reactivity ===
The nucleophilicity increases Si < Ge < Sn as well as the hyperconjugation effect known as the β-silicon effect Si < Ge << Sn. The Si–C bond is mainly covalent and the Sn–C relatively polar, bonds with germanium are in between.

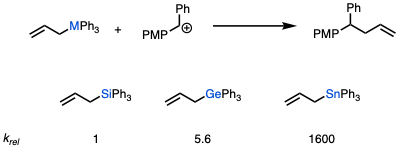

Reactivity of M-ene reaction: Si < Ge < Sn < Pb. From Si to Pb, an increasing π-σ* conjugation between the C=C double bond and the C–M bond will enhance the reactivity. It is also likely that there is some interaction between the nucleophilic end of the enophile and the metal in the reaction intermediate which lowers the energy of the transition state.
