= Menshutkin reaction =

Chemical reaction

| Named after | Nikolai Menshutkin |
| Reaction type | Coupling reaction |

Identifiers
| RSC ontology ID | RXNO:0000223 |

In organic chemistry, the Menshutkin reaction converts a tertiary amine into a quaternary ammonium salt by reaction with an alkyl halide. Similar reactions occur when tertiary phosphines are treated with alkyl halides.

Menshutkin-reaction

The reaction is the method of choice for the synthesis of quaternary ammonium class phase transfer catalysts.

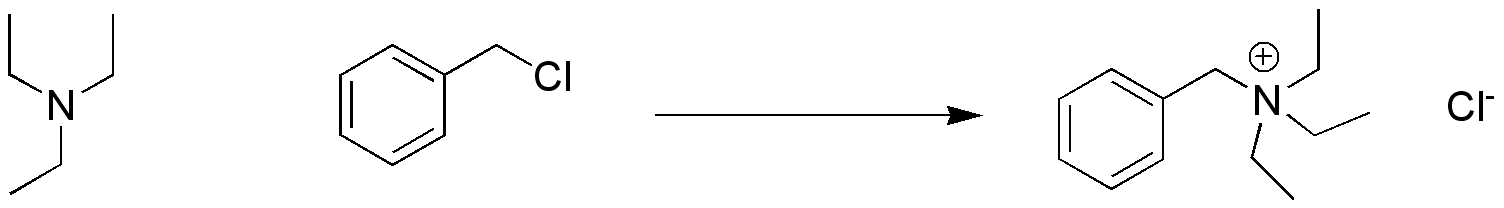

== Scope ==
Reactions are typically conducted in polar solvents such as alcohols. Alkyl iodides are superior alkylating agents relative to the bromides, which in turn are superior to chlorides. As is typical for an S_{N}2 process, benzylic, allylic, and α-carbonylated alkyl halides are excellent reactants. Even though alkyl chlorides are poor alkylating agents (gem-dichlorides especially so), amines should not be handled in chlorinated solvents such as dichloromethane and dichloroethane, especially at high temperatures, due to the possibility of a Menshutkin reaction. (Sometimes, kinetically facile reactions like acylations are sometimes conducted in chlorinated solvents nonetheless.) Highly nucleophilic tertiary amines like DABCO will react with dichloromethane at room temperature overnight and at reflux (39-40 °C) over several hours to give the quaternized product (see the article on Selectfluor). Due to steric hindrance and unfavorable electronic properties, chloroform reacts very slowly with tertiary amines over a period of several weeks to months. Even pyridines, which are considerably less nucleophilic than typical tertiary amines, react with dichloromethane at room temperature over a period of several days to weeks to give bis(pyridinium)methane salts.

In addition to solvent and alkylating agent, other factors strongly influence the reaction. In one particular macrocycle system the reaction rate is not only accelerated (150000 fold compared to quinuclidine) but the halide order is also changed

Accelerated reaction.

== History ==
The reaction is named after its discoverer, Nikolai Menshutkin, who described the procedure in 1890. Depending on the source, his name (and the reaction named after him) is spelled as Menšutkin, Menshutkin, or Menschutkin.
