= Radical fluorination =

Radical fluorination is a type of fluorination reaction, complementary to nucleophilic and electrophilic approaches. It involves the reaction of an independently generated carbon-centered radical with an atomic fluorine source and yields an organofluorine compound.

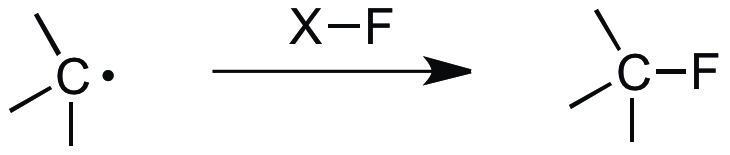

Historically, only three atomic fluorine sources were available for radical fluorination: Fluorine (F_{2}), hypofluorites (O–F based reagents) and XeF_{2}. Their high reactivity, and the difficult handling of F_{2} and the hypofluorites, limited the development of radical fluorination compared to electrophilic and nucleophilic methods. The uncovering of the ability of electrophilic N–F fluorinating agents to act as an atomic fluorine source led to a renaissance in radical fluorination.

Various methodologies have since been developed for the radical formation of C–F bonds. The radical intermediates have been generated from carboxylic acids and boronic acid derivatives, by radical addition to alkenes, or C–H and C–C bond activations. New sources of atomic fluorine are now emerging, such as metal fluoride complexes.

== Sources of atomic fluorine ==
=== Fluorine gas ===
Fluorine gas (F_{2}) can act both as an electrophilic and atomic source of fluorine. The weak F–F bond strength (36 kcal/mol (150 kJ/mol)) allows for homolytic cleavage. The reaction of F_{2} with organic compounds is, however, highly exothermic and can lead to non-selective fluorinations and C–C cleavage, as well as explosions. Only a few selective radical fluorination methods have been reported. The use of fluorine for radical fluorination is mainly limited to perfluorination reactions.

=== O–F reagents ===
The O–F bond of hypofluorites is relatively weak. For trifluoromethyl hypofluorite (CF_{3}OF), it has been estimated to be 43.5 kcal/mol (182 kJ/mol). The ability of trifluoromethyl hypofluorite to transfer fluorine to alkyl radicals is notably demonstrated by reacting independently generated ethyl radicals from ethene and tritium in the presence of CF_{3}OF. The high reactivity of hypofluorites has limited their application to selective radical fluorination. They can, however, be used as radical initiators for polymerization.

=== XeF_{2} ===
Xenon difluoride (XeF_{2}) has mainly been used for radical fluorination in radical decarboxylative fluorination reactions. In this Hunsdiecker-type reaction, xenon difluoride is used to generate the radical intermediate, as well as the fluorine transfer source.

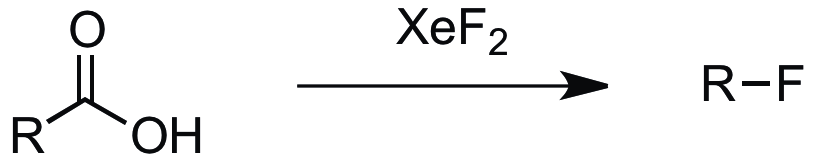

XeF_{2} can also be used to generate aryl radicals from arylsilanes, and act as an atomic fluorine source to furnish aryl fluorides.

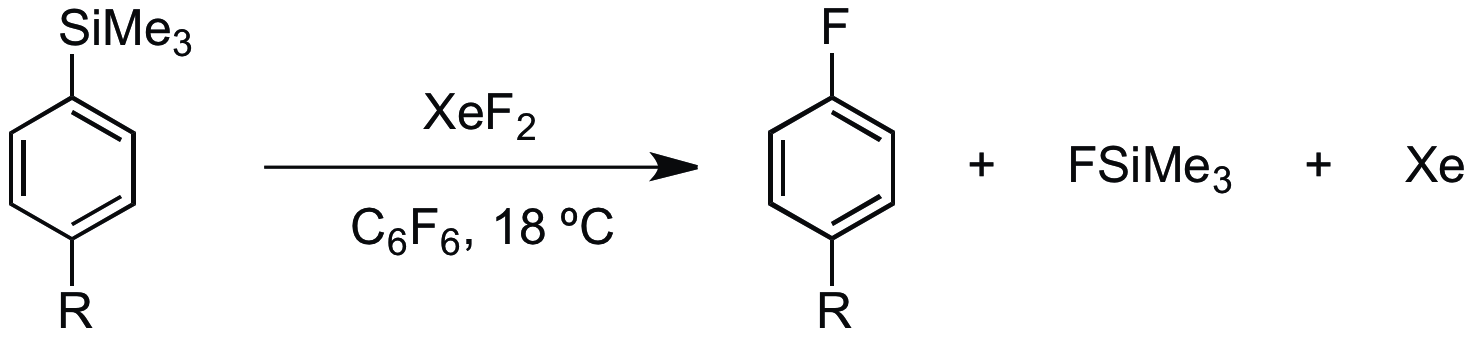

=== N–F reagents ===
Selectfluor and N-fluorobenzenesulfonimide (NFSI) are traditionally used as electrophilic sources of fluorine, but their ability to transfer fluorine to alkyl radicals has recently been demonstrated. They are now commonly used as fluorine transfer agents to alkyl radicals.

=== Others ===
Examples of radical fluorination using bromine trifluoride (BrF_{3}) and fluorinated solvents have been reported. Recent examples in radical fluorination suggest that in-situ generated metal fluoride complexes can also act as fluorine transfer agents to alkyl radicals.

== Radical fluorination methodologies ==
=== Decarboxylative fluorination ===
The thermolysis of t-butyl peresters has been used to generate alkyl radicals in presence of NFSI and Selectfluor. The radicals' intermediates were efficiently fluorinated, demonstrating the ability of the two electrophilic fluorinating agents to transfer fluorine to alkyl radicals.

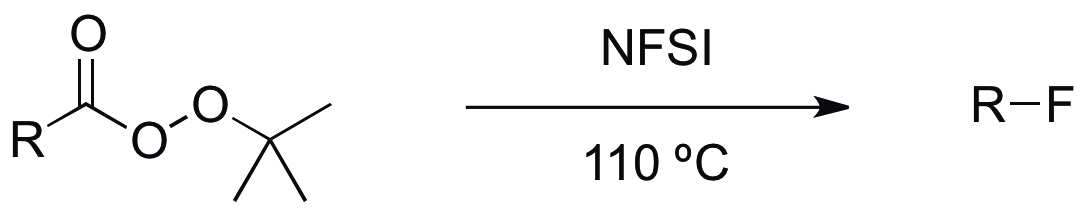

Carboxylic acids can be used as radical precursors in radical fluorination methods. Metal catalysts such as silver and manganese have been used to induce the fluorodecarboxylation. The fluorodecarboxylation of carboxylic acids can also be triggered using photoredox catalysis. More specifically, phenoxyacetic acid derivatives have been shown to undergo fluorodecarboxylation when directly exposed to ultraviolet irradiation or via the use of a photosensitizer.

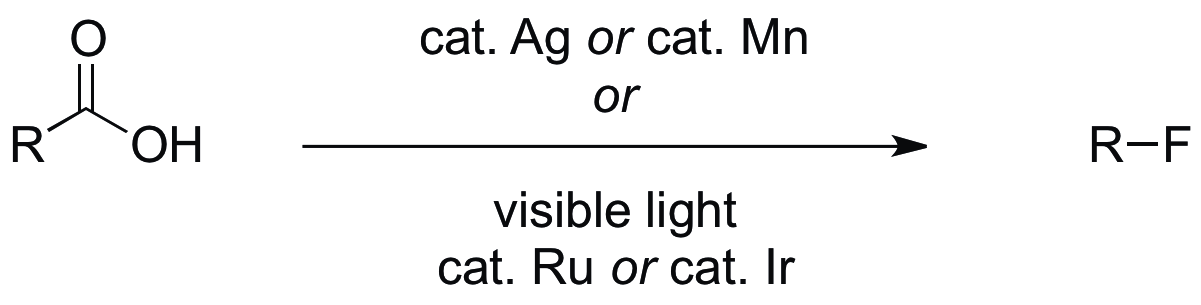

=== Radical fluorination of alkenes ===
Alkyl radicals generated from radical additions to alkenes have also been fluorinated. Hydrides and nitrogen-, carbon-, and phosphorus-centered radicals have been employed, yielding a wide range of fluorinated difunctionalized compounds.

=== Fluorination of boronic acid derivatives ===
Alkyl fluorides have been synthesized via radicals generated from boronic acid derivatives using silver.

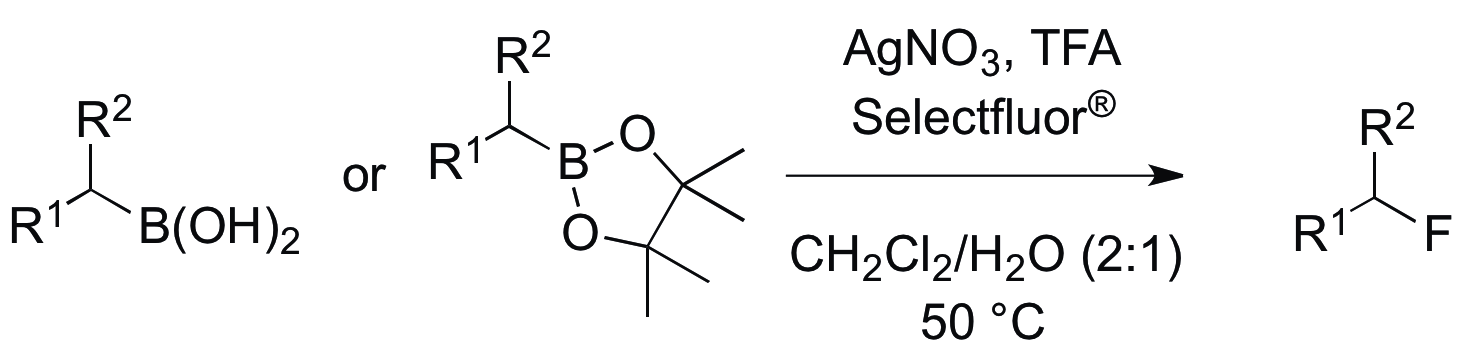

=== C(sp^{3})–H fluorination ===
One major advantage of radical fluorination is that it allows the direct fluorination of remote C–H bonds. Metal catalysts such as manganese, copper, and tungsten have been used to promote the reaction. Metal-free C(sp^{3})–H fluorinations rely on the use of radical initiators (triethylborane, persulfates or N-oxyl radicals) or organic photocatalysts.

Some methods have also been developed to selectively fluorinate benzylic C–H bonds.

=== C–C bond activation ===
Cyclobutanols and cyclopropanols have been used as radical precursors for the synthesis of β- or γ-fluoroketones. The strained rings undergo C–C bond cleavage in presence of a silver or an iron catalyst or when exposed to ultraviolet light in presence of a photosensitizer.

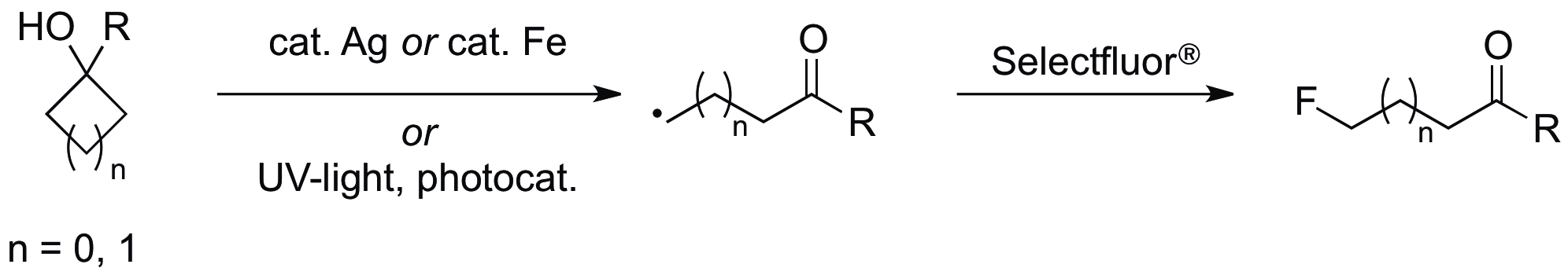

== Potential applications ==
One potential application of radical fluorination is for efficiently accessing novel moieties to serve as building blocks in medicinal chemistry. Derivatives of propellane with reactive functional groups, such as the hydrochloride salt of 3-fluorobicyclo[1.1.1]pentan-1-amine, are accessible by this approach.
