= Deuterium iodide =

Names
- IUPAC name (^{2}H)iodane
- Other names Hydriodic acid-d Hydrogen-d iodide Deuterium monoiodide Deuteriodic acid Hydrogen iodide-d

Identifiers
CAS Number	14104-45-1
3D model (JSmol)	Interactive image
PubChem CID	518878
- InChI: InChI=1S/HI/h1H/i/hD Key: XMBWDFGMSWQBCA-DYCDLGHISA-N
- SMILES: [2H]I

Properties
Chemical formula	DI
Molar mass	128.9186 g·mol^{-1}
Density	5.75 g/L(at 0 °C); 5.27 g/L (at 25 °C
Melting point	−51.93 °C (−61.47 °F; 221.22 K)
Boiling point	−35.1 °C (−31.2 °F; 238.1 K)
Conjugate acid	Iodonium
Conjugate base	Iodide

Hazards
NFPA 704 (fire diamond)	3 0 0 COR

Related compounds
Related compounds	Deuterium fluoride Deuterium chloride Deuterium bromide
- Except where otherwise noted, data are given for materials in their standard state (at 25 °C [77 °F], 100 kPa). Infobox references

Deuterium iodide is an inorganic compound with the formula DI.

== Properties ==
The triple point of DI is 221.511 K at 49.10 kPa. This is at a lower temperature than for HI at 222.497 K and 50.74 kPa. The enthalpy of fusion of DI is 2841.2 J mol^{−1}.

The rate of reaction of DI with atomic nitrogen is much lower than for HI.

Three solid phases of deuterium iodide exist. From the lowest to highest temperature, these have space groups: triclinic P1̅ (0 - 77K), orthorhombic Cmca (77 - 128 K), and cubic Fm3m (128 - 221.5 K melting point).

Boiling Point is 237.0 K which is half a degree lower than that of protium iodide.

== See also ==
- Hydrogen iodide

== Extra reading ==
- Hilsabeck, Kallie I.; Meiser, Jana L.; Sneha, Mahima; Balakrishnan, N.; Zare, Richard N. (2019). "Photon catalysis of deuterium iodide photodissociation". Physical Chemistry Chemical Physics. 21 (26): 14195–14204. Bibcode:2019PCCP...2114195H. doi:10.1039/c8cp06107f. PMID 30516765.
- Carter, Robert J.; Hamill, William H.; Williams, Russell R. (December 1955). "The Kinetics of Hot Deuterium Atoms in the Photolysis of Deuterium Iodide 1,2". Journal of the American Chemical Society. 77 (24): 6457–6460. Bibcode:1955JAChS..77.6457C. doi:10.1021/ja01629a008.
- "THE FAR-INFRARED SPECTRUM OF DEUTERIUM IODIDE (DI)". OSU International Symposium on Molecular Spectroscopy 1990-1999.
