= Trifluoromethyl hypofluorite =

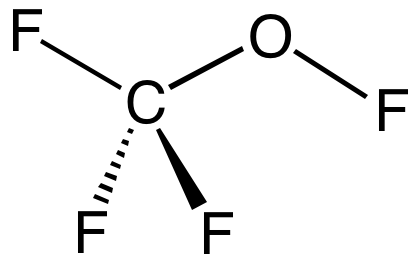

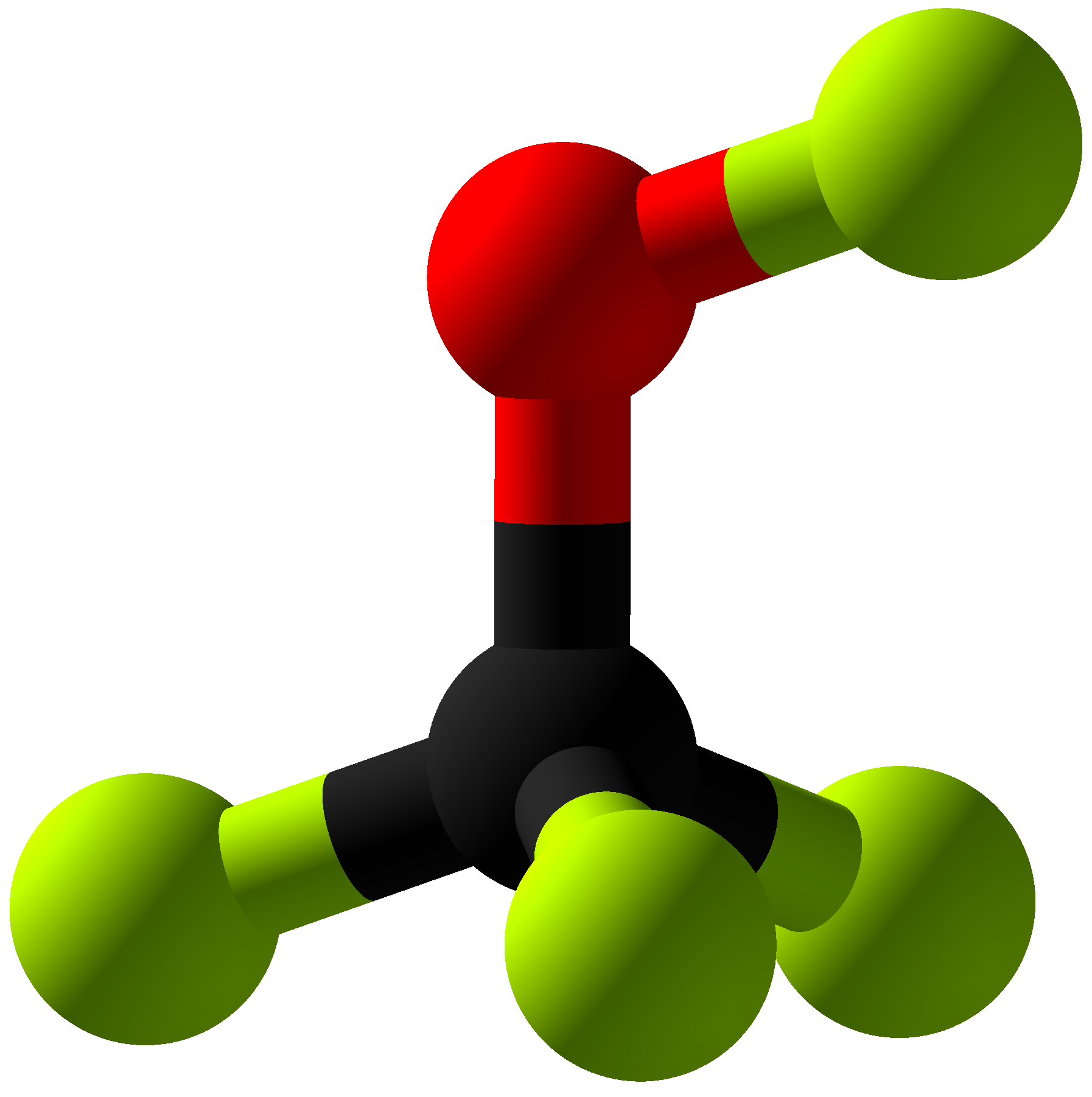

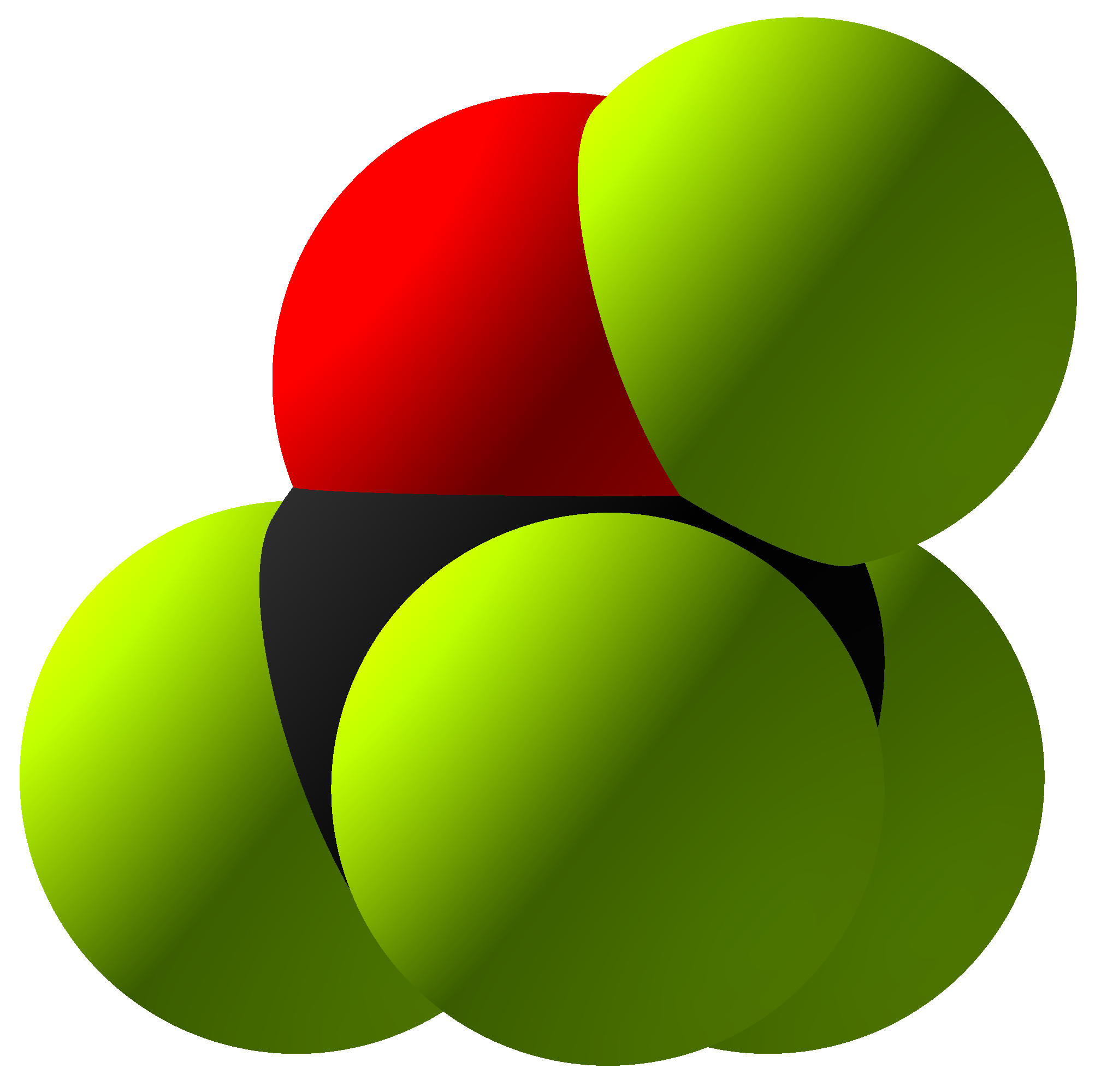
Carbon, C
Oxygen, O
Fluorine, F

Names
- Preferred IUPAC name Trifluoromethyl hypofluorite

Identifiers
CAS Number	373-91-1
3D model (JSmol)	Interactive image
ChemSpider	71322
ECHA InfoCard	100.006.157
PubChem CID	78989
CompTox Dashboard (EPA)	DTXSID4073174
- InChI: InChI=1S/CF4O/c2-1(3,4)6-5 Key: SMBZJSVIKJMSFP-UHFFFAOYSA-N; InChI=1/CF4O/c2-1(3,4)6-5 Key: SMBZJSVIKJMSFP-UHFFFAOYAC
- SMILES: FC(F)(F)OF

Properties
Chemical formula	CF_{3}OF
Molar mass	104.004012 g/mol
Appearance	Colourless gas
Melting point	−213 °C (−351.4 °F; 60.1 K)
Boiling point	−95 °C (−139 °F; 178 K)

Hazards
- Occupational safety and health (OHS/OSH)
Main hazards	Toxic
- Except where otherwise noted, data are given for materials in their standard state (at 25 °C [77 °F], 100 kPa). (what is ?) Infobox references

Trifluoromethyl hypofluorite is an organofluorine compound with the chemical formula CF_{3}OF. Its chemical structure resembles methanol, but every hydrogen atom is replaced by a fluorine atom. Trifluoromethyl hypofluorite is a toxic gas at room temperature, exploding when condensed; but in small quantities the compound is useful for certain fluorination reactions in organic chemistry.

== Structure ==
It exists as a colorless gas at room temperature and is highly toxic.

It is a rare example of a hypofluorite (compound with an O−F bond), the trifluoromethyl ester of hypofluorous acid.

== Generation ==
It is prepared by the reaction of fluorine gas with carbon monoxide, over a cesium fluoride catalyst:

2 F_{2} + CO → CF_{3}OF

The reaction is too dangerous for commercial use. The process is highly exothermic, each reagent is either extremely toxic or corrosive, and the product is liable to explode when condensed.

== Reactions ==
The gas hydrolyzes only slowly at neutral pH.

In organic chemistry, the compound adds electrophilic fluorine to multiple bonds. It has been used for the preparation of α-fluoroketones from silyl enol ethers and N-fluoroamides from iminoethers. It directly fluorinates activated arenes. Behaving like a pseudohalogen, CF_{3}OF adds to ethylene to give the ether:

CF_{3}OF + CH_{2}CH_{2} → CF_{3}OCH_{2}CH_{2}F

With saturated compounds, it usually performs an indiscriminate radical fluorination. But radical traps cause the reaction to instead selectively fluorinate tertiary carbons.
