= C7H11NO =

The molecular formula C_{7}H_{11}NO may refer to:

- 6-Acetyl-2,3,4,5-tetrahydropyridine
- 3-Quinuclidone
