= Deuterium chloride =

- Space-filling model of deuterium chloride with atom symbols

Names
- IUPAC name (^{2}H)chlorane
- Other names Hydrochloric acid-d Hydrogen-d chloride Deuterium monochloride Deuteriochloric acid Hydrogen chloride-d

Identifiers
CAS Number	7698-05-7
3D model (JSmol)	Interactive image
ChemSpider	455896
ECHA InfoCard	100.028.833
EC Number	231-715-8
PubChem CID	522634
- InChI: InChI=1S/ClH/h1H/i/hD Key: VEXZGXHMUGYJMC-DYCDLGHISA-N
- SMILES: [2H]Cl

Properties
Chemical formula	DCl
Molar mass	37.46 g·mol^{-1}
Appearance	Colorless gas
Melting point	−114 °C (−173 °F; 159 K)
Boiling point	−84.899 °C (−120.818 °F; 188.251 K) ± 9 °C (48 °F)
Conjugate acid	Chloronium
Conjugate base	Chloride

Hazards
- GHS labelling
Pictograms	(GHS04: Compressed Gas) (GHS05: Corrosive) (GHS06: Toxic) (GHS07: Exclamation mark)
Signal word	Danger
Hazard statements	H280, H314, H331, H335
Precautionary statements	P260, P264, P271, P280, P301+P330+P331, P302+P361+P354, P304+P340, P305+P354+P338, P316, P319, P321, P363, P403+P233, P405, P410+P403, P501
NFPA 704 (fire diamond)	3 0 0

Related compounds
Related compounds	Deuterium fluoride Deuterium bromide Deuterium iodide
- Except where otherwise noted, data are given for materials in their standard state (at 25 °C [77 °F], 100 kPa). Infobox references

Deuterium chloride is an inorganic compound with the formula DCl.

== Properties ==
=== Reations ===
Deuterium chloride ionizes in heavy water to form deuteronium ions and chloride ions:

$$\mathrm{DCl + D_2O \rightleftharpoons D_3O^+ + Cl^-}$$

Neutron diffraction measurements of concentrated DCl in D_{2}O confirmed the presence of D_{3}O^{+} ions in the solution.

It also undergoes ionic dissociation on the surface of heavy-water ice. Infrared reflection–absorption spectroscopy of DCl adsorbed on thin D_{2}O ice films at 110 K showed a strong absorption band attributed to D_{3}O^{+} and no detectable absorption band attributable to molecular DCl under the experimental conditions.

== See also ==
- Hydrogen chloride
