= Electrophilic halogenation =

Chemical reaction in which halogen substituents are added to aromatic molecules

In organic chemistry, an electrophilic aromatic halogenation is a type of electrophilic aromatic substitution. This organic reaction is typical of aromatic compounds and a very useful method for adding substituents to an aromatic system.

Halogenation of benzene where X is the halogen, catalyst represents the catalyst (if needed) and HX represents the protonated base.

A few types of aromatic compounds, such as phenol, will react without a catalyst, but for typical benzene derivatives with less reactive substrates, a Lewis acid is required as a catalyst. Typical Lewis acid catalysts include AlCl_{3}, FeCl_{3}, FeBr_{3} and ZnCl_{2}. These work by forming a highly electrophilic complex which is attacked by the benzene ring.

== Reaction mechanism ==
The reaction mechanism for chlorination of benzene is the same as bromination of benzene. Iron(III) bromide and iron(III) chloride become inactivated if they react with water, including moisture in the air. Therefore, they are generated by adding iron filings to bromine or chlorine. Here is the mechanism of this reaction:

The mechanism for bromination of benzene

The mechanism for iodination is slightly different: iodine (I_{2}) is treated with an oxidizing agent such as nitric acid to obtain the electrophilic iodine ("I^{+}", probably IONO_{2}). Other conditions for iodination include I_{2}, HIO_{3}, H_{2}SO_{4}, and N-iodosuccinimide, H_{2}SO_{4}. These conditions are successful for highly deactivated arenes, including nitroaromatics.

In a series of studies, the powerful reagent obtained by using a mixture of iodine and potassium iodate dissolved in concentrated sulfuric acid was used. Here the iodinating agent is the triiodine cation I_{3}^{+} and the base is HSO_{4}^{−}. In these studies both the kinetics of the reaction and the preparative conditions for the iodination of strongly deactivated compounds, such as benzoic acid and 3-nitrobenzotrifluoride, were investigated.

While electrophilic fluorination is possible with F_{2}/N_{2} (10%), XeF_{2}, or N-F reagents like Selectfluor, these methods are seldom used, due to the formation of isomeric mixtures and polyfluorination products. Although mixtures also form in the case of other aromatic halogenations, fluoroaromatics are often extremely challenging to separate from their nonfluorinated, polyfluorinated, and/or isomeric counterparts.

The initial step of the halogenation of aromatic compounds differs from that of the halogenation of alkenes in that alkenes do not require a catalyst to enhance the electrophilicity of the halogen. The formation of the arenium ion results in the temporary loss of aromaticity, which has a higher activation energy compared to halonium ion formation in alkenes. In other words, alkenes are more reactive and do not need to have the Br–Br or Cl–Cl bond weakened.

== Scope ==
If the ring contains a strongly activating substituent such as –OH, –OR or amines, a catalyst is not necessary, for example in the bromination of p-cresol:

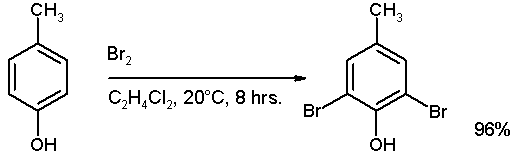

However, if a catalyst is used with excess bromine, then a tribromide will be formed.

Halogenation of phenols is faster in polar solvents in a basic environment due to the dissociation of phenol, with phenoxide ions being more susceptible to electrophilic attack as they are more electron-rich.

Chlorination of toluene with chlorine without catalyst requires a polar solvent as well such as acetic acid. The ortho to para selectivity is low:

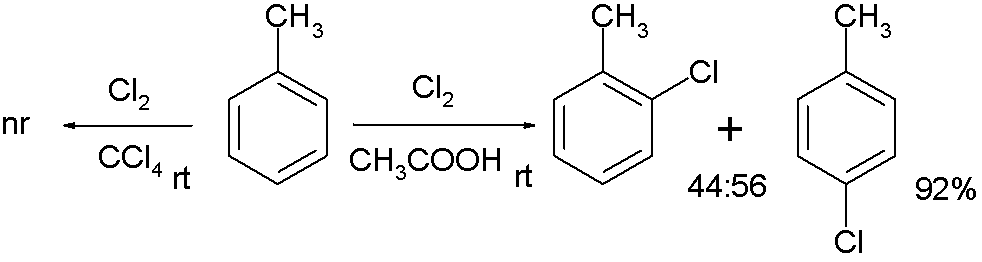

No reaction takes place when the solvent is replaced by tetrachloromethane. In contrast, when the reactant is 2-phenylethylamine, it is possible to employ relatively apolar solvents with exclusive ortho- regioselectivity due to the intermediate formation of a chloramine, enabling the Intramolecular reaction.

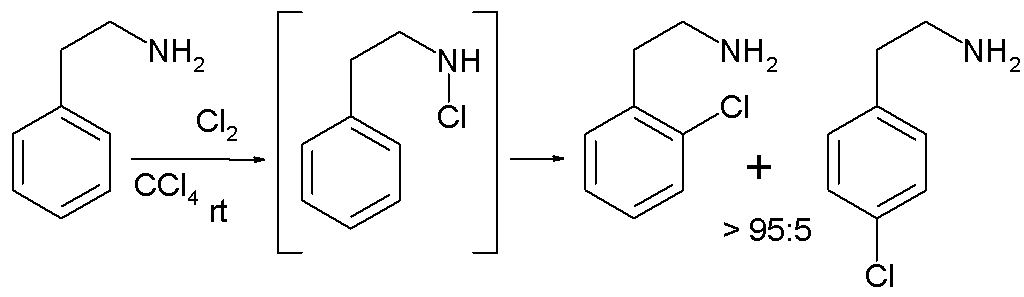

The food dye erythrosine can be synthesized by iodination of another dye called fluorescein:

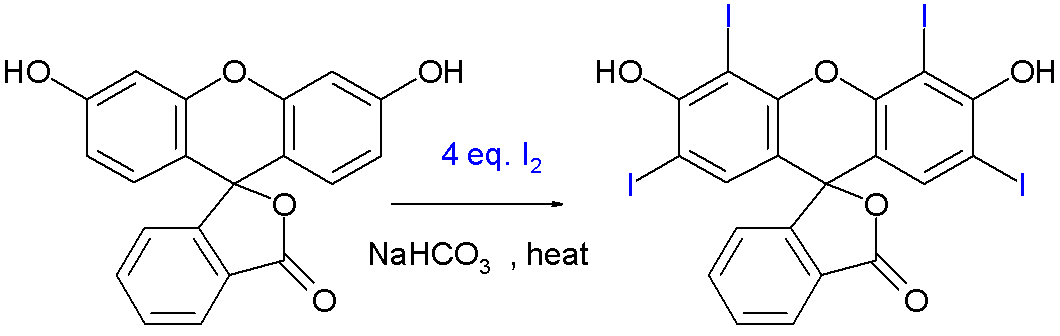

This reaction is driven by sodium bicarbonate.

== See also ==
- Electrophilic aromatic substitution
- Electrophilic fluorination
- Halogenation reactions
