= N-Fluoropyridinium triflate =

Names
- Preferred IUPAC name 1-Fluoropyridin-1-ium trifluoromethanesulfonate

Identifiers
CAS Number	107263-95-6
3D model (JSmol)	Interactive image
ChemSpider	2006704
ECHA InfoCard	100.154.995
PubChem CID	2724576
CompTox Dashboard (EPA)	DTXSID00369164
- InChI: InChI=1S/C5H5FN.CHF3O3S/c6-7-4-2-1-3-5-7;2-1(3,4)8(5,6)7/h1-5H;(H,5,6,7)/q+1;/p-1 Key: JFZMMCYRTJBQQI-UHFFFAOYSA-M
- SMILES: c1cc[n+](cc1)F.C(F)(F)(F)S(=O)(=O)[O-]

Properties
Chemical formula	C_{6}H_{5}F_{4}NO_{3}S
Molar mass	247.16 g·mol^{−1}
Appearance	White solid
Melting point	185–187 °C (365–369 °F; 458–460 K)
- Except where otherwise noted, data are given for materials in their standard state (at 25 °C [77 °F], 100 kPa). Infobox references

N-Fluoropyridinium triflate is an organofluorine compound with the formula [C_{5}H_{5}NF]O_{3}SCF_{3}. It is a white solid with low solubility in polar organic solvents. The compound is used as an electrophilic fluorinating agent. It is a salt, consisting of the N-fluoropyridinium cation ([C_{5}H_{5}NF]^{+}) and the triflate anion. Related reagents include Selectfluor, which is also an N-fluorinated salt.

N-Fluoropyridinium cations are not only electrophilic fluorinating agents (i.e., sources of "F^{+}"), they are also one-electron oxidants.
