= Tetraxenonogold(II) =

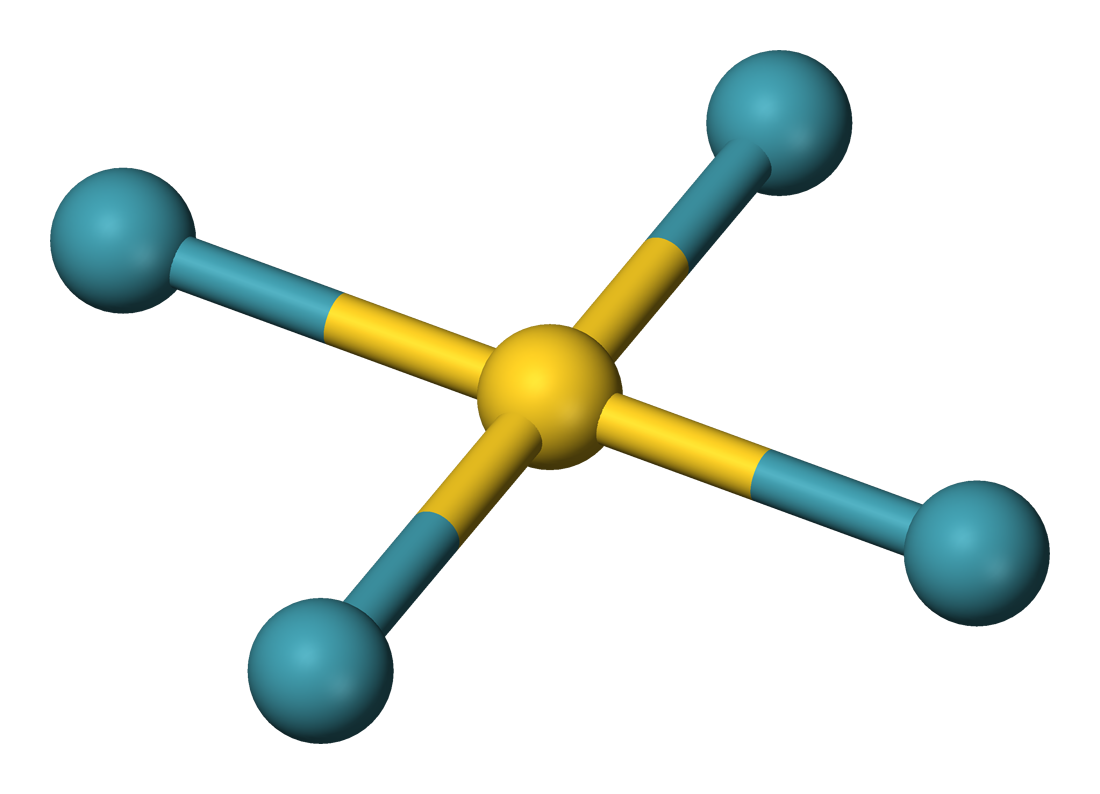

Names
- IUPAC name Tetraxenonogold(II)

Identifiers
3D model (JSmol)	Interactive image
ChemSpider	21106483
PubChem CID	139031022
- InChI: InChI=1S/Au.4Xe/q+2;;;; Key: FIAFJDZYGVZLAJ-UHFFFAOYSA-N; InChI=1/Au.4Xe/q+2;;;;/rAuXe4/c2-1(3,4)5/q+2 Key: FIAFJDZYGVZLAJ-YSLMZIHEAX
- SMILES: [Xe+][Au-2]([Xe+])([Xe+])[Xe+]

Properties
Chemical formula	AuXe_{4}^{2+}
Molar mass	722.137 g·mol^{−1}
- Except where otherwise noted, data are given for materials in their standard state (at 25 °C [77 °F], 100 kPa). Infobox references

Tetraxenonogold(II), gold(II) tetraxenide, or AuXe_{4}^{2+} is a cationic complex consisting of a central gold atom surrounded by four xenon atoms. It is a covalent complex with a square planar geometry. The complex is found in the compound AuXe_{4}^{2+}(Sb_{2}F_{11}^{−})_{2} (tetraxenonogold(II) undecafluorodiantimonate). This compound, which exists in triclinic and tetragonal crystal modifications, has the AuXe_{4}^{2+} ion that is stabilised by interactions with the fluoride atoms of the counterion. The Au-Xe bond length is 274 pm (2.74 Å). Tetraxenonogold(II) is unusual in that it is a coordination complex of xenon, which is weakly basic. It is also unusual in that it contains gold in the +2 oxidation state. It can be produced by reduction of gold(III) fluoride (AuF_{3}) by xenon in the presence of fluoroantimonic acid. The salt crystallises at low temperature.

It was the first description of a compound between a noble gas and a noble metal. It was first described in 2000 by Konrad Seppelt and Stefan Seidel. Several related compounds containing gold(III)–xenon and gold(I)–xenon bonds have since been isolated.
