= Nikolai Menshutkin =

Russian chemist

- Николай Меншуткин
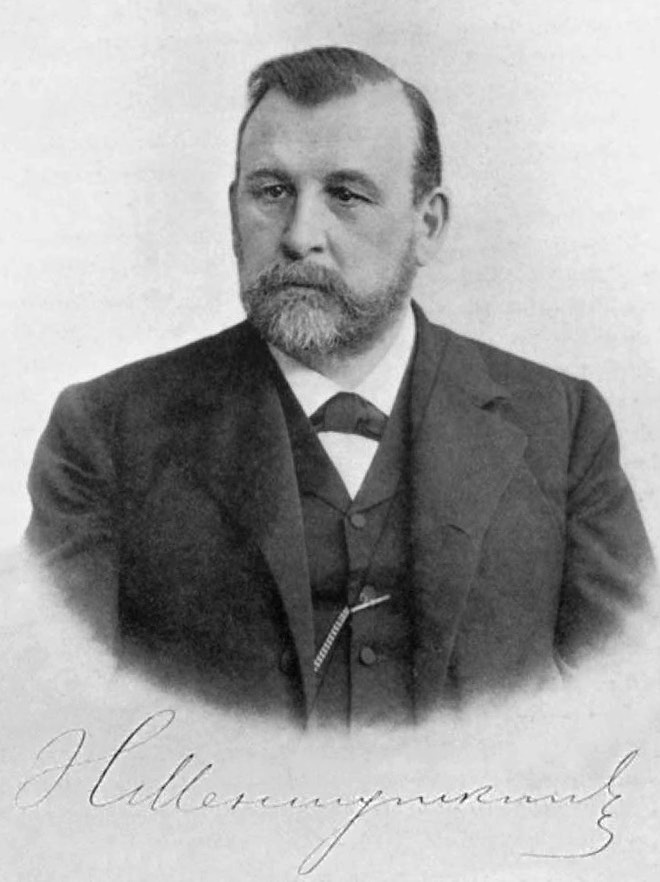
- Born: October 24, 1842; Saint Petersburg, Russian Empire
- Died: February 5, 1907 (aged 64); Saint Petersburg, Russian Empire
- Known for: Discovery of the Menshutkin reaction
- Scientific career
- Fields: Chemistry
- Workplaces: University of St. Petersburg

Nikolai Aleksandrovich Menshutkin (Russian: Николай Александрович Меншуткин; 24 October [O.S. 12 October] 1842 – 5 February [O.S. 22 January] 1907) was a Russian chemist who discovered the process of converting a tertiary amine to a quaternary ammonium salt via the reaction with an alkyl halide, now known as the Menshutkin reaction.

== Biography ==
Menshutkin was born in a merchant family as the sixth son of Alexander Nikolaevitch Menshutkin. He graduated with honors from gymnasium in December 1857, but only by autumn 1858 managed to enroll to the Saint Petersburg State University, as he was still under the prescribed age of 16. He studied at the faculty of physics and mathematics and was nearly expelled in the autumn of 1861 due to some political disturbances. Nevertheless, by the spring of 1862 he attained the master's degree. During the last years he became interested in chemistry, which he studied under Dmitri Mendeleev. While he acquired a sufficient knowledge of theory he was lacking practice, as at that time the entire laboratory of the university consisted of only two small rooms. Therefore, he went abroad, and in the following three years spent two semesters with Adolph Strecker at the University of Tübingen, a year (1864–5) with Charles-Adolphe Wurtz at the University of Paris, and a semester with Adolph Wilhelm Hermann Kolbe at the University of Marburg.

In the meantime, many changes were introduced into the constitution of the Russian universities. In 1863 the universities obtained academic freedom, they chose for themselves the professors, deans, and rectors, at the same time the means of teaching improved, and, owing to Mendeleev’s efforts, the laboratory at St. Petersburg University was enlarged. In 1865 Menshutkin returned to St. Petersburg, just after his PhD thesis was published in the Comptes Rendus of the French Academy under the title “Action du chlorure d’acetyle sur l’acide phosphoreux”. He defended it in March 1866 against Aleksandr Butlerov and Dmitri Mendeleev and in autumn began teaching a course on organic nitrogen compounds. On 6 April 1869, he defended his habilitation on “The Synthesis and Properties of the Ureides” and shortly was appointed as professor of analytical chemistry. In connection with his teaching he proceeded to rearrange the course of instructions and in 1871 brought out his well-known textbook, which survived 16 editions up to 1931 and had been translated into German and English. In 1871, Menshutkin became secretary of the faculty of physics and mathematics and in 1879 was appointed as dean, an office which he held until 1887.

The assassination of the Emperor Alexander II in 1881 was followed by the adoption of severe measures, from the effects of which the universities suffered in many ways. The autonomy granted in 1863 was revoked and all officials could only be appointed by the Minister of Public Instruction; the admission of students was hindered by accepting them only from certain schools, the fees were raised and the number of professorships reduced. The discontent by professors and students resulted in disturbances in 1887-8, which were followed by the resignation of the rector and several key officials. As a result, Menshutkin had to add teaching of organic chemistry to his duties. About this time he prepared his large handbook of organic chemistry, which appeared in three successive editions, and in 1888 he published a history of the development of chemical theory. Both books were written in Russian and not translated. One of Menshutkin’s most serious undertakings of the time was the building of the new chemical laboratories of the University. Only by 1890 money could be found for this purpose and in this year Mendeleev resigned his chair, leaving Menshutkin in the position of senior professor of the university. Menshutkin managed to build the laboratories by October 1894 and worked there for eight years.

In 1902 Menshutkin was transferred to the new Polytechnic Institute, about 6 km north of St. Petersburg, while retaining the professorship in the university. There he acted as professor of analytical and organic chemistry and dean of the mining division. From the establishment of the Russian Chemical Society in 1868, and until 1891, Menshutkin served as its secretary and became its president in 1906. As deputy of a province he was able to improve popular education and help establishing several new schools. At the end of 1905 he took an active part in the elections for the first Duma, and was one of the founders of the Party of Democratic Reform. Menshutkin had suffered for many years from disorder of the kidneys. He survived an attack at the end of 1906, but then suddenly died in February 1907.

== Research ==
For his PhD thesis, Menshutkin studied the reactions of phosphonic acid and was able to prove that not all three hydrogen atoms in the molecule are equivalent and therefore the formula HP(O)(OH)_{2} is more likely than P(OH)_{3}. In 1890 Menshutkin discovered that a tertiary amine can be converted into a quaternary ammonium salt by reaction with an alkyl halide.

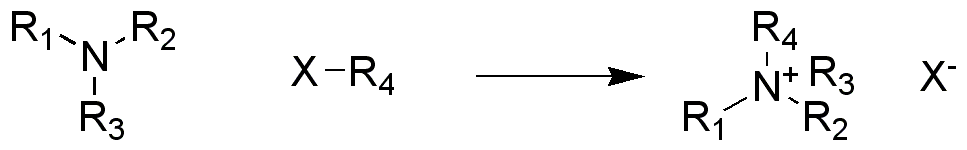
Menshutkin-reaction

Menshutkin further studied the influence of isomerism among alcohols and acids on esterification and showed that, both in respect of rate and limit, the primary, secondary, and tertiary alcohols differ from one another, and that unsaturated differ from saturated alcohols. The molecular weight of the alcohol concerned has also a considerable influence on the result, the limit rising generally with molecular weight, although the rate is diminished. The first series of experiments were made with acetic acid and alcohols and were extended to a variety of acids. Subsequently, the rate of chemical change was studied in the case of the formation of amides and anilides by the action of ammonia and aniline on acids by means of the same method as was employed in the esterification experiments. Here again the influence of isomeric differences was equally manifest. These researches led on to others, such as the study of the mutual displacement of bases in homogeneous systems, and the influence of temperature on the rate of several reactions.

Menshutkin further studied the effect of different solvents on the reaction rates. Although the solvent is unaltered after the reaction, its influence on the reaction rate was significant. The stabilization of the reactants, products and intermediate phases or transition states depended strongly on the polarity of the solvent, and therefore this polarity had a large influence on the reaction rate. Because of the formation of ionic products, the effect was especially strong in the Menshutkin reaction making it an ideal tool to study the effect of solvent on the reaction rate. The Menshutkin reaction is still used for this purpose.

Between 1889 and 1895 Menshutkin focused on amines, on the kinetics of their interaction with alkyl halogen compounds and its dependence on the isomerism. Continuing these investigations down to the end of his life, he succeeded in establishing a large number of other relations between the structure or constitution and chemical activity, as well as physical properties, such as boiling point, melting point and specific gravity. He is regarded as a pioneer in chemical kinetics, not for the priority, but for systematic development of this field.
