= Quinuclidine =

Skeletal formula of quinuclidine
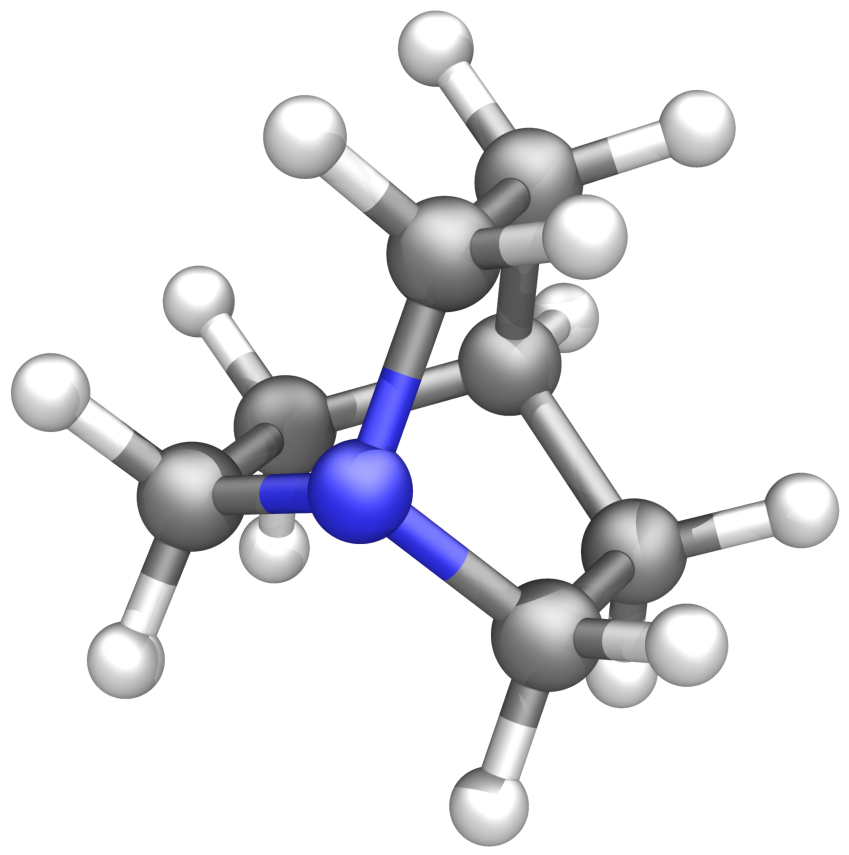
Ball-and-stick model of quinuclidine

Names
- Preferred IUPAC name 1-Azabicyclo[2.2.2]octane
- Other names Quinuclidine

Identifiers
CAS Number	100-76-5
3D model (JSmol)	Interactive image
Beilstein Reference	103111
ChEBI	CHEBI:38420
ChEMBL	ChEMBL1209648
ChemSpider	7246
ECHA InfoCard	100.002.625
EC Number	202-887-1
Gmelin Reference	26726
PubChem CID	7527
UNII	XFX99FC5VI
CompTox Dashboard (EPA)	DTXSID2057607
- InChI: InChI=1S/C7H13N/c1-4-8-5-2-7(1)3-6-8/h7H,1-6H2 Key: SBYHFKPVCBCYGV-UHFFFAOYSA-N; InChI=1/C7H13N/c1-4-8-5-2-7(1)3-6-8/h7H,1-6H2 Key: SBYHFKPVCBCYGV-UHFFFAOYAA
- SMILES: N12CCC(CC1)CC2

Properties
Chemical formula	C_{7}H_{13}N
Molar mass	111.188 g·mol^{−1}
Density	0.97 g/cm^{3}
Melting point	157 to 160 °C (315 to 320 °F; 430 to 433 K)
Boiling point	149.5 °C (301.1 °F; 422.6 K) at 760 mmHg
Acidity (pK_{a})	11.0 (conjugate acid)

Hazards
- GHS labelling
Pictograms	(GHS05: Corrosive) (GHS06: Toxic) (GHS07: Exclamation mark)
Signal word	Danger
Hazard statements	H301, H310, H315, H318
Precautionary statements	P262, P264, P264+P265, P270, P280, P301+P316, P302+P352, P305+P354+P338, P316, P317, P321, P330, P332+P317, P361+P364, P362+P364, P405, P501
Flash point	36.5 °C (97.7 °F; 309.6 K)
- Except where otherwise noted, data are given for materials in their standard state (at 25 °C [77 °F], 100 kPa). verify (what is ?) Infobox references

Quinuclidine is an organic compound with the formula HC(C_{2}H_{4})_{3}N. It is a bicyclic amine that can be viewed as a tied back version of triethylamine. It is a colorless solid. It is used as a reagent (base) and catalyst. It can be prepared by reduction of quinuclidone.

== Structure and chemical properties ==
Regarding its structure, quinuclidine is unusual in that the methylene hydrogen atoms are eclipsed within each of the three ethylene linkages. Furthermore, the cyclohexane rings, of which there are three, adopt the boat conformations, not the usual chair conformations.

Quinuclidine is a relatively strong organic base with pK_{a} of the conjugate acid of 11.3. The basicity of other quinuclidines have been evaluated: 3-hydroxy- quinuclidine (9.9), 3-acetoxyquinuclidine (9.3), 3-chloroquinuclidine (8.9), DABCO (8.7), and 3-quinuclidone (7.2).

It forms adducts with a variety of Lewis acids. Because of its compact structure, quinuclidine binds to trimethylborane more tightly than does triethylamine.

== Derivatives and analogues ==
Quinine is a quinuclidine derivative.

Quinuclidine is structurally related to DABCO, in which the other bridgehead is also nitrogen, and to tropane, which has a slightly different carbon frame. Due to this similarity, as with tropane, certain quinuclidines such as solifenacin, aclidinium bromide and 3-Quinuclidinyl benzilate possess antimuscarinic properties.

Cinchona alkaloids, e.g. quinine, feature quinuclidine substituents. Aceclidine, a simple quinuclidine derivative, is a drug used for treatment of glaucoma.
