= Fluoronium =

Ion

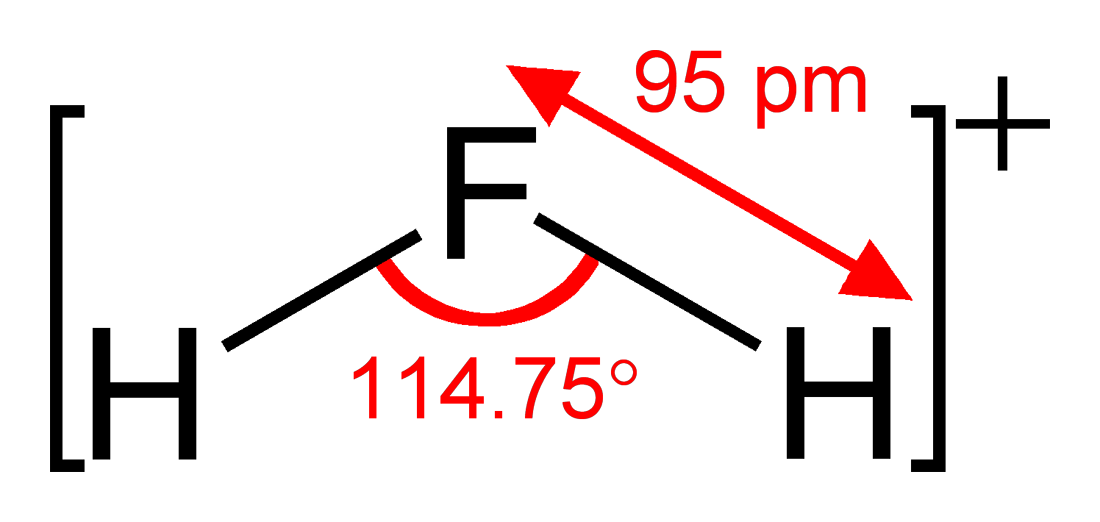

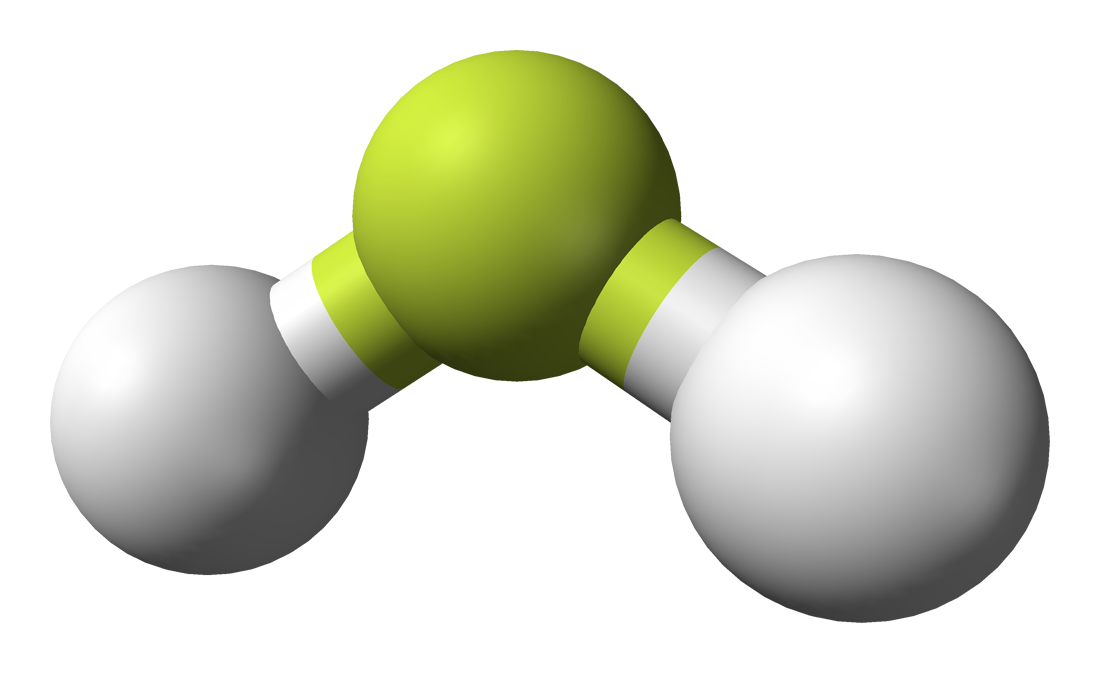
Ball-and-stick model of fluoronium
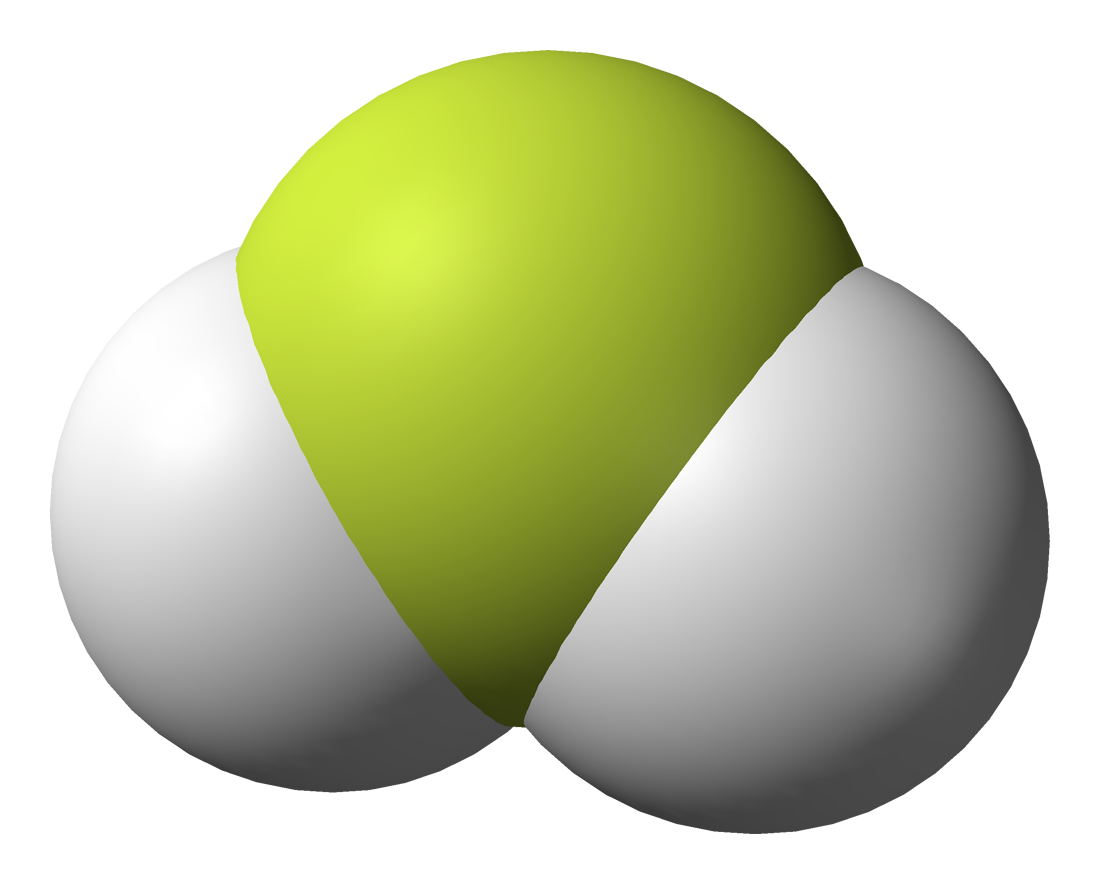
Spacefill model of fluoronium

Names
- IUPAC name Fluoronium
- Systematic IUPAC name Fluoranium

Identifiers
CAS Number	12206-67-6
3D model (JSmol)	Interactive image
ChEBI	CHEBI:50314
ChemSpider	19122106
CompTox Dashboard (EPA)	DTXSID901027202
- InChI: InChI=1S/FH2/h1H2/q+1 Key: YNESUKSMQODWNS-UHFFFAOYSA-N; InChI=1/FH2/h1H2/q+1 Key: YNESUKSMQODWNS-UHFFFAOYAK
- SMILES: [FH2+]

Properties
Chemical formula	H_{2}F^{+}
Molar mass	21.01374 g mol^{−1}
Conjugate base	Hydrogen fluoride
- Except where otherwise noted, data are given for materials in their standard state (at 25 °C [77 °F], 100 kPa). verify (what is ?) Infobox references

The fluoronium ion is an inorganic cation with the chemical formula H_{2}F^{+}. It is one of the cations found in fluoroantimonic acid. The structure of the salt with the Sb_{2}F^{−}_{11} anion has been determined. The fluoronium ion is isoelectronic with the water molecule and the azanide ion.

The term can also refer to organyl substituted species of type H––R, R––R, or R_{2}C=F^{+}. In contrast to the heavier halogens, which have long been known to form open-chain halonium ions (such as [Me_{2}Cl]^{+}[Al(OTeF_{5})_{4}]^{–}) as well as cyclic haliranium ions, fluorine was not believed to form fluoronium ions of type R––R until the recent characterization of a fluoronium ion locked in a designed cage structure by Lectka and coworkers. Recent solvolysis experiments and NMR spectroscopic studies on a metastable [C–F–C]^{+} fluoronium ion strongly support the dicoordinated fluoronium structure over the alternative rapidly equilibrating classical carbocation. Definitive structural proof of the symmetrical [C–F–C]^{+} was reported by Riedel, Lectka, and coworkers by single crystal X-ray diffraction analysis. Besides its synthesis and crystallographic characterization as the [Sb_{2}F_{11}]^{−} salt, vibrational spectra could be recorded and a detailed analysis concerning the nature of the bonding situation in this fluoronium ion and its heavier halonium homologues was reported.
