= Aceclidine =

Drug used in narrow angle glaucoma

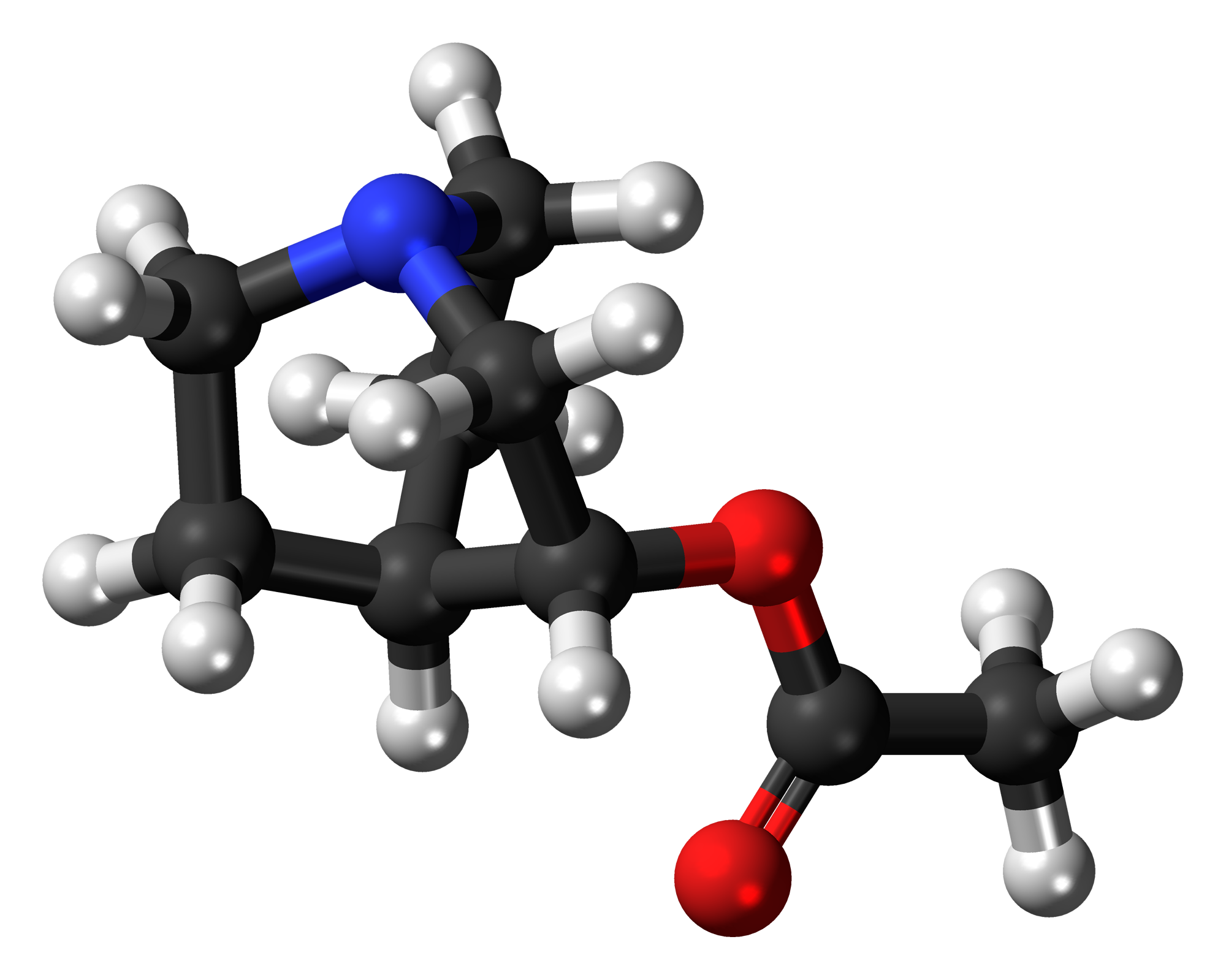

Clinical data
- Other names: LNZ101
- AHFS/Drugs.com: Vizz
- License data: US DailyMed: Aceclidine
- Routes of administration: Topical (ophthalmic solution)
- ATC code: S01EB08 (WHO)

Legal status
- Legal status: US: ℞-only; In general: ℞ (Prescription only)

Identifiers
- IUPAC name: 1-Azabicyclo[2.2.2]oct-3-yl acetate; 3-Quinuclidinyl Acetate
- CAS Number: 827-61-2; 6109-70-2
- PubChem CID: 1979
- ChemSpider: 1902
- UNII: 0578K3ELIO
- KEGG: D02750
- ChEMBL: ChEMBL20835
- CompTox Dashboard (EPA): DTXSID2045658
- ECHA InfoCard: 100.011.431

Chemical and physical data
- Formula: C_{9}H_{15}NO_{2}
- Molar mass: 169.224 g·mol^{−1}
- 3D model (JSmol): Interactive image
- SMILES: O=C(OC2C1CCN(CC1)C2)C
- InChI: InChI=1S/C9H15NO2/c1-7(11)12-9-6-10-4-2-8(9)3-5-10/h8-9H,2-6H2,1H3; Key:WRJPSSPFHGNBMG-UHFFFAOYSA-N

Aceclidine is a parasympathomimetic cholinergic drug that functions as a muscarinic acetylcholine receptor agonist. It is used in ophthalmology as a miotic agent to constrict the pupil. Historically used in Europe for the treatment of glaucoma, aceclidine received its first U.S. approval in 2025 under the brand name Vizz as a topical eye drop for the correction of presbyopia. Its mechanism of action produces pupil contraction with a relatively minimal effect on the ciliary muscle, which improves near visual acuity through a "pinhole" depth-of-field effect without inducing significant accommodative spasm.

== Medical uses ==
=== Glaucoma ===
As a parasympathomimetic miotic, aceclidine decreases intraocular pressure by stimulating muscarinic receptors in the eye, which constricts the pupil and opens the trabecular meshwork to facilitate aqueous humor outflow. It was used as a topical drop in the treatment of narrow-angle and open-angle glaucoma. The clinical utility of aceclidine in glaucoma is comparable to other cholinergic miotics such as pilocarpine, though aceclidine was associated with less ciliary muscle spasm and fewer accommodative disturbances. The use of aceclidine for chronic glaucoma management has declined as other therapeutic classes, such as beta-blockers and prostaglandin analogs, became available.

=== Presbyopia ===
In 2025, the U.S. Food and Drug Administration (FDA) approved aceclidine 1.44 % ophthalmic solution (Vizz) for the topical treatment of presbyopia. The treatment involves a once-daily application to constrict the pupil, creating a pinhole effect that increases the depth of focus and improves near vision. Data from the Clarity 1 and 2 clinical trials showed that the administration of aceclidine resulted in a statistically significant improvement in near visual acuity within approximately 30 minutes, with a duration of effect of up to 8–10 hours. Distance vision was not significantly affected due to the drug's limited action on the ciliary muscle. No serious adverse events were reported in the trials. Common side effects included transient ocular irritation, mild headache, and reduced vision in low-light conditions. Aceclidine became the second pharmacological agent approved for presbyopia in the U.S., following a pilocarpine-based product approved in 2021.

== Pharmacology ==
=== Pharmacokinetics ===
Aceclidine, when administered ophthalmically, is absorbed primarily through the conjunctival and corneal tissues. Its onset of action is rapid due to efficient local absorption. Systemically, aceclidine undergoes limited metabolism, as its primary site of effect is the eye, thereby minimizing significant systemic exposure. Distribution following ocular administration is predominantly localized, with low risk of systemic accumulation. Excretion details are not extensively characterized, but, like other topical miotic agents, aceclidine is presumed to have minimal systemic bioavailability and is likely eliminated primarily via the local ocular route and normal metabolic pathways.

=== Mechanism of action ===
Aceclidine is a selective muscarinic acetylcholine receptor agonist used primarily in ophthalmology. Its mechanism of action involves binding preferentially to muscarinic receptors on the iris sphincter muscle, leading to pupillary constriction (miosis) with minimal stimulation of the ciliary muscle. Unlike non-selective miotic agents such as pilocarpine, aceclidine's selectivity results in a pronounced reduction in pupil size without significant induction of accommodation or myopic shift, thereby minimizing side effects like lens thickening or accommodative spasm. This targeted action is leveraged in the treatment of presbyopia, where the drug induces a “pinhole” effect: by creating a small, stable pupil, aceclidine increases the depth of focus and improves near vision while maintaining distance visual acuity. Its limited activity on the ciliary muscle distinguishes it from other cholinergic agonists and offers a favorable safety profile, with a reduced risk of retina or vitreous traction and fewer accommodative disturbances.

== Chemistry ==
Aceclidine is also known as 3-acetoxyquinuclidine. The protonated derivative has a pKa of 9.3.

== History ==
This compound was first synthesized by researchers in the Soviet Union in the early 1960s, and was subsequently investigated for glaucoma therapy. It was introduced in European ophthalmology by the late 1960s. In several European countries, it was marketed by Chibret under the trade name Glaucostat. Although not approved in the United States at that time, it was used clinically in other countries as a topical agent to lower intraocular pressure. By the 1970s, it was available under various brand names, including Glaucostat, Glaucotat, Glaunorm, and Glaudin. A combination product with epinephrine was also marketed as Glaucadrine. These formulations were used to manage glaucoma, particularly in cases where miosis facilitates a reduction in intraocular pressure.

== Research ==
Aceclidine has been a subject of clinical and pharmacological research since the 1960s. Early studies in the 1970s compared its efficacy for glaucoma to that of pilocarpine, finding it produced a similar reduction in intraocular pressure with a lesser effect on accommodation. Research in the 1980s on its optical isomers determined the (+)-enantiomer was the primary source of its cholinergic activity.

In the 2010s, research refocused on aceclidine as a potential treatment for presbyopia due to its pupil-selective mechanism. Under the development code PRX-100, Lenz Therapeutics conducted the Clarity 1, 2, and 3 clinical trials. Clarity 1 and 2 were Phase III trials that evaluated aceclidine 1.44 % in adults with presbyopia and met all primary and secondary endpoints for improving near visual acuity. Clarity 3 was a long-term study that confirmed the drug's safety and tolerability over a six-month period. The results of these trials formed the basis for its FDA approval in 2025.
