= Quinuclidone =

Quinuclidones are a class of bicyclic organic compounds with chemical formula C_{7}H_{11}NO with two structural isomers for the base skeleton 3-quinuclidone and 2-quinuclidone.

Quinuclidone structures: 1: 2-quinuclidone; 2: 2-quinuclidone hydrotetrafluoroborate; 3: 3-quinuclidone; 4: 3-quinuclidone hydrochloride

3-Quinuclidone (1-azabicyclo[2.2.2]octan-3-one) is an uneventful molecule that can be synthesized as the hydrochloric acid salt by a Dieckman condensation:

The other isomer, 2-quinuclidone, appears equally uneventful, but in fact it has defied synthesis until 2006. The reason is that this molecule is very unstable because its amide group has the amine lone pair and the carbonyl group not properly aligned, as may be expected for an amide, as a result of steric strain. This behaviour is predicted by Bredt's Rule, and formal amide group resembles in fact an amine, as evidenced by the ease of salt formation.

The organic synthesis of the tetrafluoroborate salt of 2-quinuclidone is a six-step affair starting from norcamphor the final step being an azide - ketone Schmidt reaction (38% yield):

2-quinuclidone salt synthesis starting from norcamphor

This compound rapidly reacts with water to the corresponding amino acid with a chemical half-life of 15 seconds. X-ray diffraction shows pyramidalization on the nitrogen atom (59° compared to 0 for reference dimethylformamide) and torsion around the carbon-nitrogen bond to an extent of 91°. Attempts to prepare the free-base lead to uncontrolled polymerization.

It is, nevertheless, possible to estimate its basicity in an experiment in which amine pairs (the quinuclidonium salt and a reference amine such as diethylamine or indoline) are introduced into a mass spectrometer. The relative basicity is then revealed by collision-induced dissociation of the heterodimer. Further analysis via the extended kinetic method allows for the determination of the proton affinity and gas phase basicity of 2-quinuclidonium. This method has determined that quinuclidone ranks among secondary and tertiary amines in terms of proton affinity. This high basicity is hypothesized to be due to the loss of electron delocalization when the amide bond is twisted—this causes misalignment of the pi orbitals, resulting in loss of electron resonance.
