= DABCO =

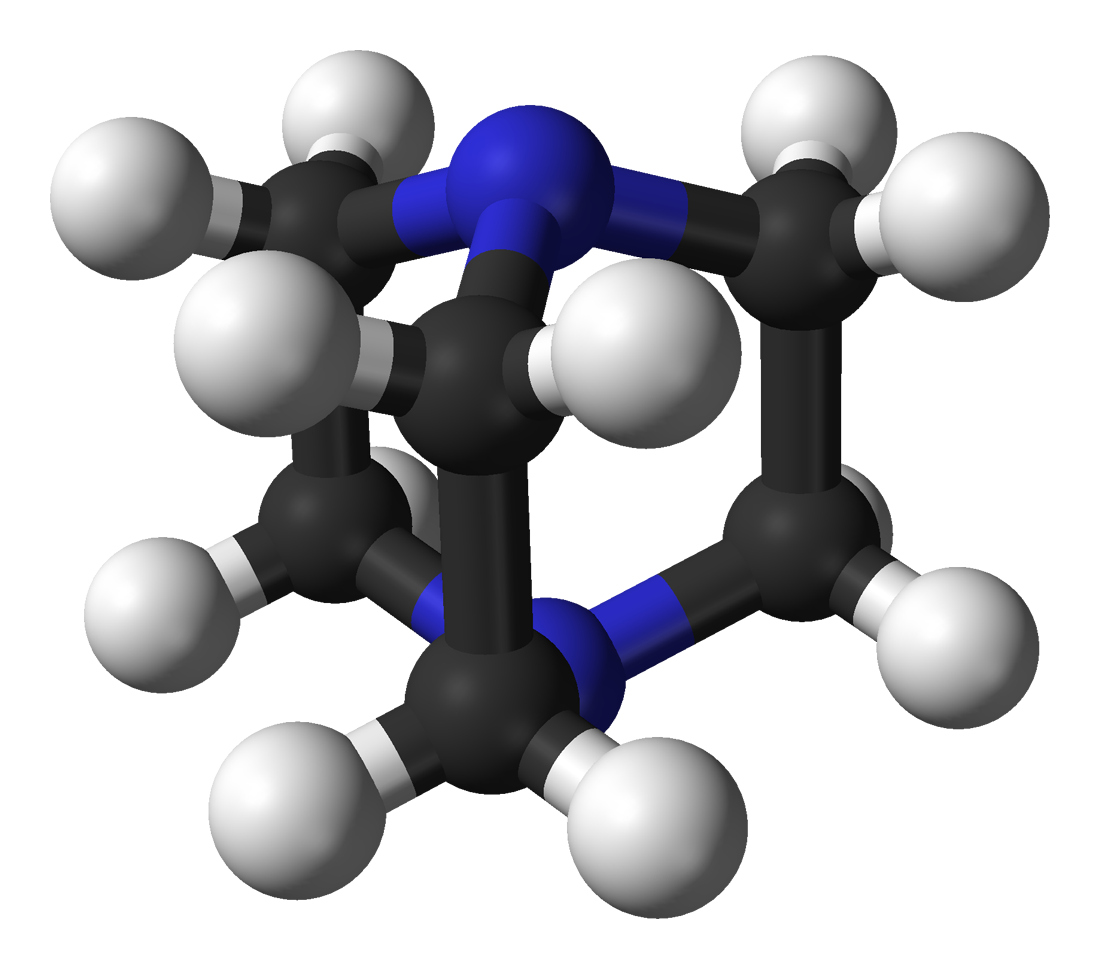

Names
- Preferred IUPAC name 1,4-Diazabicyclo[2.2.2]octane
- Other names Diazabicyclooctane, Triethylenediamine, TEDA

Identifiers
CAS Number	280-57-9
3D model (JSmol)	Interactive image; Interactive image
ChEBI	CHEBI:151129
ChEMBL	ChEMBL3183414
ChemSpider	8882
ECHA InfoCard	100.005.455
EC Number	205-999-9
IUPHAR/BPS	2577
PubChem CID	9237
UNII	X8M57R0JS5
CompTox Dashboard (EPA)	DTXSID0022016
- InChI: InChI=1S/C6H12N2/c1-2-8-5-3-7(1)4-6-8/h1-6H2 Key: IMNIMPAHZVJRPE-UHFFFAOYSA-N; InChI=1S/C6H12N2/c1-2-8-5-3-7(1)4-6-8/h1-6H2 Key: IMNIMPAHZVJRPE-UHFFFAOYSA-N; InChI=1/C6H12N2/c1-2-8-5-3-7(1)4-6-8/h1-6H2 Key: IMNIMPAHZVJRPE-UHFFFAOYAP
- SMILES: C1CN2CCN1CC2; N12CCN(CC1)CC2

Properties
Chemical formula	C_{6}H_{12}N_{2}
Molar mass	112.176 g·mol^{−1}
Appearance	White crystalline powder
Melting point	156 to 160 °C (313 to 320 °F; 429 to 433 K)
Boiling point	174 °C (345 °F; 447 K)
Solubility in water	Soluble, hygroscopic
Acidity (pK_{a})	3.0, 8.8 (in water, for conjugated acid)

Hazards
- Occupational safety and health (OHS/OSH)
Main hazards	Harmful
- GHS labelling
Pictograms	(GHS02: Flammable) (GHS05: Corrosive) (GHS07: Exclamation mark)
Signal word	Danger
Hazard statements	H228, H302, H315, H319, H335, H412
Precautionary statements	P210, P261, P273, P305+P351+P338
NFPA 704 (fire diamond)	2 2 1
Flash point	62 °C (144 °F; 335 K)

Related compounds
Related compounds	Quinuclidine; Tropane
- Except where otherwise noted, data are given for materials in their standard state (at 25 °C [77 °F], 100 kPa). verify (what is ?) Infobox references

DABCO (1,4-diazabicyclo[2.2.2]octane), also known as triethylenediamine or TEDA, is a bicyclic organic compound with the formula N_{2}(C_{2}H_{4})_{3}. This colorless solid is a highly nucleophilic tertiary amine base, which is used as a catalyst and reagent in polymerization and organic synthesis.

It is similar in structure to quinuclidine, but the latter has one of the nitrogen atoms replaced by a carbon atom. Regarding their structures, both DABCO and quinuclidine are unusual in that the methylene hydrogen atoms are eclipsed within each of the three ethylene linkages. Furthermore, the diazacyclohexane rings adopt the boat conformations, not the usual chair conformations.

== Reactions ==
The pK_{a} of [HDABCO]^{+} (the protonated derivative) is 8.8, which is almost the same as ordinary alkylamines. The nucleophilicity of the amine is high because the amine centers are unhindered. It is sufficiently basic to promote a variety of coupling reactions.

=== Catalyst ===
DABCO is used as a nucleophilic catalyst for:

- formation of polyurethane from alcohol and isocyanate functionalized monomers and pre-polymers.
- Baylis–Hillman reactions of aldehydes and unsaturated ketones and aldehydes.

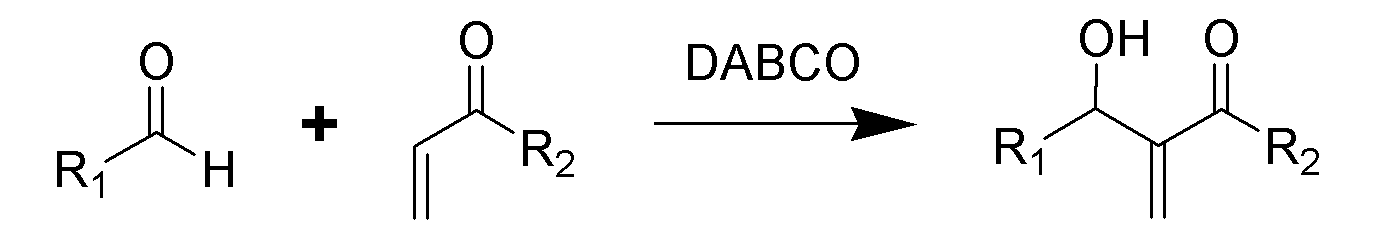

=== Lewis base ===
Selectfluor

The reagent Selectfluor is derived by alkylation of DABCO with dichloromethane following by treatment with fluorine. A colourless salt that tolerates air, Selectfluor has been commercialized for use for electrophilic fluorination.

As an unhindered amine, it is a strong ligand and Lewis base. It forms a crystalline 2:1 adduct with hydrogen peroxide and sulfur dioxide.

=== Quencher of singlet oxygen ===
DABCO and related amines are quenchers of singlet oxygen and effective antioxidants, and can be used to improve the lifetime of dyes. This makes DABCO useful in dye lasers and in mounting samples for fluorescence microscopy (when used with glycerol and PBS). DABCO can also be used to demethylate quaternary ammonium salts by heating in dimethylformamide (DMF).

== Production ==
It is produced by thermal reactions of compounds of the type H_{2}NCH_{2}CH_{2}X (X = OH, NH_{2}, or NHR) in the presence of zeolitic catalysts. An idealized conversion is shown for the conversion from ethanolamine:

3 H_{2}NCH_{2}CH_{2}OH → N(CH_{2}CH_{2})_{3}N + NH_{3} + 3 H_{2}O

== Uses ==
In chemical and biological defense, activated carbon is impregnated with DABCO for use in filters for masks, collective protection systems, and the like.
