= Halogen addition reaction =

Reaction which adds a halogen molecule

A halogen addition reaction is a simple organic reaction where a halogen molecule is added to the carbon–carbon double bond of an alkene functional group.

The general chemical formula of the halogen addition reaction is:

C=C + X_{2} → X−C−C−X

(X represents the halogens bromine or chlorine, and in this case, a solvent could be CH_{2}Cl_{2} or CCl_{4}). The product is a vicinal dihalide.

This type of reaction is a halogenation and an electrophilic addition.

== Reaction mechanism ==
The reaction mechanism for an alkene bromination can be described as follows. In the first step of the reaction, a bromine molecule approaches the electron-rich alkene carbon–carbon double bond. The bromine atom closer to the bond takes on a partial positive charge as its electrons are repelled by the electrons of the double bond.

Bromine addition to alkene reaction mechanism	A bromide ion attacks the C–Br σ* antibonding molecular orbital of a bromonium ion
Bromine addition to alkene reaction mechanism	A bromide ion attacks the C–Br σ* antibonding molecular orbital of a bromonium ion

The atom is electrophilic at this time and is attacked by the pi electrons of the alkene [carbon–carbon double bond]. It forms for an instant a single sigma bond to both of the carbon atoms involved. The bonding of bromine is special in this intermediate, due to its relatively large size compared to carbon, the bromide ion is capable of interacting with both carbons which once shared the π-bond, making a three-membered ring. The bromide ion acquires a positive formal charge. At this moment the halogen ion is called a "bromonium ion" or "chloronium ion", respectively.

When the first bromine atom attacks the carbon–carbon π-bond, it leaves behind one of its electrons with the other bromine that it was bonded to in Br_{2}. That other atom is now a negative bromide anion and is attracted to the slight positive charge on the carbon atoms. It is blocked from nucleophilic attack on one side of the carbon chain by the first bromine atom and can only attack from the other side. As it attacks and forms a bond with one of the carbons, the bond between the first bromine atom and the other carbon atoms breaks, leaving each carbon atom with a halogen substituent.

In this way the two halogens add in an anti addition fashion, and when the alkene is part of a cycle the dibromide adopts the trans configuration. For maximum overlap of the C–Br σ* antibonding molecular orbital (the LUMO, shown to the right in red) and the nucleophile (X^{−}) lone pair (the HOMO, shown to the right below in green), X^{−} must attack the bromonium ion from behind, at carbon.

This reaction mechanism was proposed by Roberts and Kimball in 1937. With it they explained the observed stereospecific trans-additions in brominations of maleic acid and fumaric acid. Maleic acid with a cis-double bond forms the dibromide as a mixture of enantiomers:

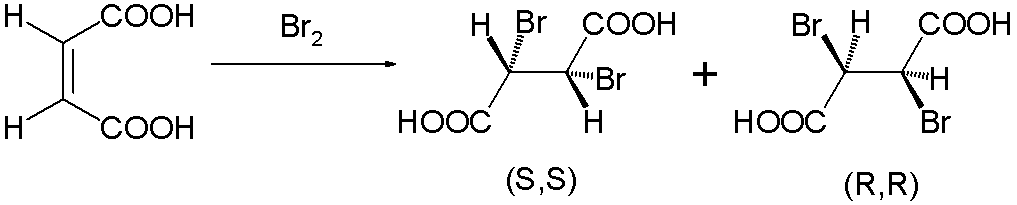

while the trans-isomer fumaric acid forms a single meso compound:

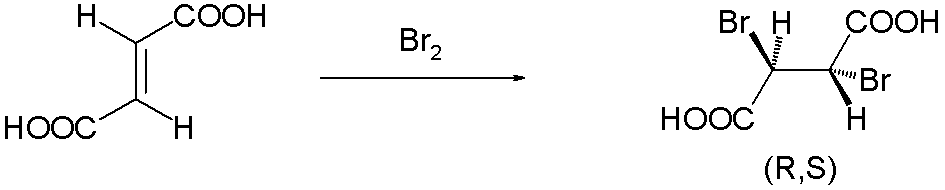

The reaction is even stereospecific in alkenes with two bulky tert-butyl groups in a cis position as in the compound cis-di-tert-butylethylene. Despite the steric repulsion present in the chloronium ion, the only product formed is the anti-adduct.

== β-Halocarbocations ==
In an alternative reaction scheme depicted below the reactive intermediate is a β-bromocarbocation or β-bromocarbonium ion with one of the carbon atoms a genuine carbocation.

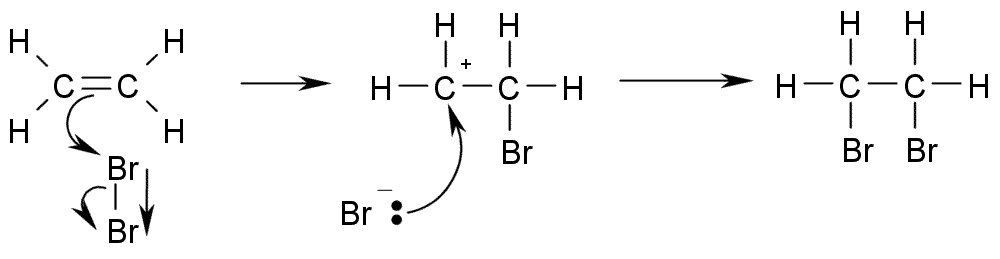

For reactions taking place through this mechanism no stereospecificity is expected and indeed not found.

Roberts and Kimball in 1937 already accounted for the fact that brominations with the maleate ion resulted in cis-addition driven by repulsion between the negatively charged carboxylic acid anions being stronger than halonium ion formation. In alkenes such as anetholes and stilbenes the substituents are able to stabilize the carbocation by donating electrons at the expense of the halonium ion.

Halonium ions can be identified by means of NMR spectroscopy. In 1967 the group of George A. Olah obtained NMR spectra of tetramethylethylenebromonium ions by dissolving 2,3-dibromo-2,3-dimethylbutane in magic acid at −60 °C. The spectrum for the corresponding fluorine compound on the other hand was consistent with a rapidly equilibrating pair of β-fluorocarbocations.

== See also ==
- Example of bromination in the Auwers synthesis
