= 3-Quinuclidone =

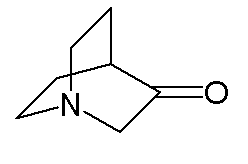

Names
- Preferred IUPAC name 1-Azabicyclo[2.2.2]octan-3-one

Identifiers
CAS Number	3731-38-2
3D model (JSmol)	Interactive image
ChEMBL	ChEMBL377716
ChemSpider	18381
ECHA InfoCard	100.020.989
EC Number	223-087-9
PubChem CID	19507
UNII	P4VF4G5PTA
CompTox Dashboard (EPA)	DTXSID0063151
- InChI: InChI=1S/C7H11NO/c9-7-5-8-3-1-6(7)2-4-8/h6H,1-5H2 Key: ZKMZPXWMMSBLNO-UHFFFAOYSA-N
- SMILES: C1CN2CCC1C(=O)C2

Properties
Chemical formula	C_{7}H_{11}NO
Molar mass	125.171 g·mol^{−1}

Hazards
- GHS labelling
Pictograms	(GHS07: Exclamation mark) (GHS09: Environmental hazard)
Signal word	Warning
Hazard statements	H302, H312, H332, H411
Precautionary statements	P261, P264, P270, P271, P273, P280, P301+P317, P302+P352, P304+P340, P317, P321, P330, P362+P364, P391, P501
- Except where otherwise noted, data are given for materials in their standard state (at 25 °C [77 °F], 100 kPa). Infobox references

3-Quinuclidinone is a bicyclic organic compounds with chemical formula HC(C_{2}H_{4})_{2}(C(O)CH_{2})N. Its basicity is indicated by the pKa of the conjugate acid, which is 7.2. In contrast quinuclidine is about 100x more basic.

== Synthesis and reactions ==
Its hydrochloride salt can be synthesized by a Dieckman condensation: It is a precursor to quinuclidine.

3-quinuclidone hydrochloride synthesis from 1-Carbethoxymethyl-4-carbethoxypiperidine

Organic reduction of 3-quinuclidone gives the compound quinuclidine, structurally related to DABCO, which has one additional bridgehead nitrogen atom.
