= Selectfluor =

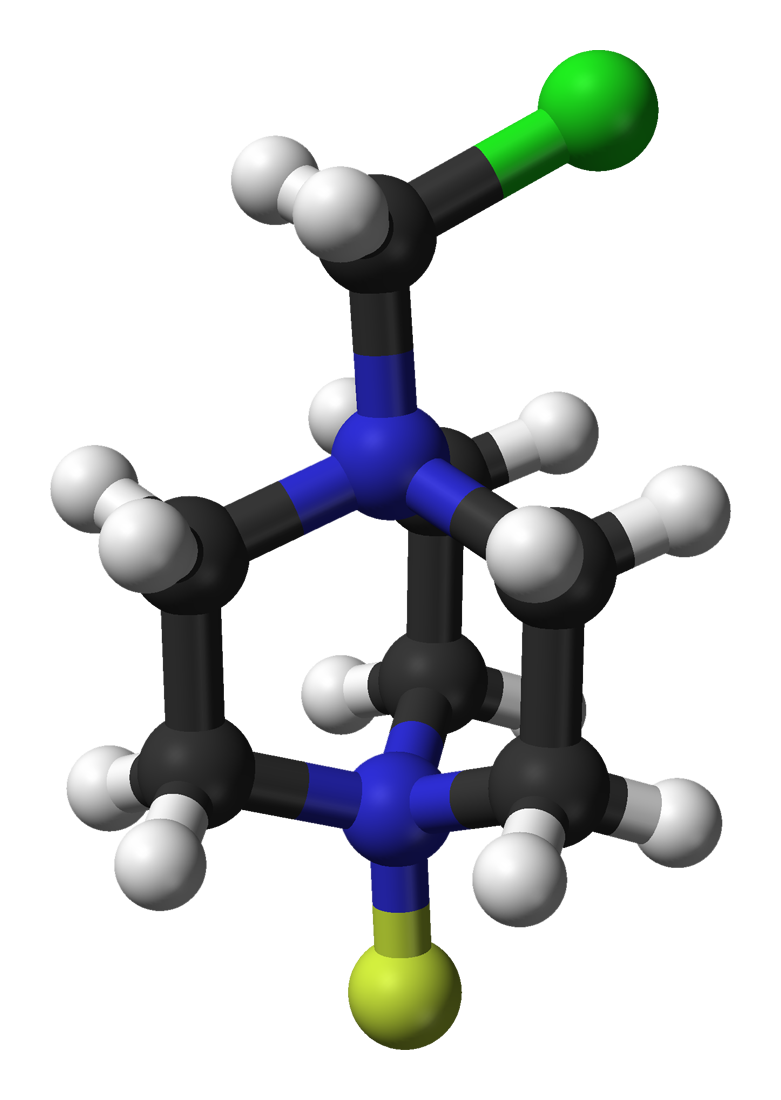

Names
- IUPAC name 1-(Chloromethyl)-4-fluoro-1,4-diazabicyclo[2.2.2]octane-1,4-diium ditetrafluoroborate
- Other names F-TEDA, N-Chloromethyl-N-fluorotriethylenediammonium bis(tetrafluoroborate); 1-Chloromethyl-4-fluoro-1,4-diazoniabicyclo[2.2.2]octane bis(tetrafluoroborate)

Identifiers
CAS Number	140681-55-6
3D model (JSmol)	Interactive image
ChemSpider	2007047
ECHA InfoCard	100.101.349
EC Number	414-380-4
PubChem CID	2724933
UNII	4P1ZA6R76D
CompTox Dashboard (EPA)	DTXSID0073112
- InChI: InChI=1S/C7H14ClFN2.2BF4/c8-7-10-1-4-11(9,5-2-10)6-3-10;2*2-1(3,4)5/h1-7H2;;/q+2;2*-1 Key: TXRPHPUGYLSHCX-UHFFFAOYSA-N; InChI=1/C7H14ClFN2.2BF4/c8-7-10-1-4-11(9,5-2-10)6-3-10;2*2-1(3,4)5/h1-7H2;;/q+2;2*-1 Key: TXRPHPUGYLSHCX-UHFFFAOYAI
- SMILES: [B-](F)(F)(F)F.[B-](F)(F)(F)F.C1C[N+]2(CC[N+]1(CC2)CCl)F

Properties
Chemical formula	C_{7}H_{14}B_{2}ClF_{9}N_{2}
Molar mass	354.26 g/mol
Appearance	colourless solid
Melting point	190 °C (374 °F; 463 K) decomposes >80 °C, exact m.p. is uncertain
- Except where otherwise noted, data are given for materials in their standard state (at 25 °C [77 °F], 100 kPa). verify (what is ?) Infobox references

Selectfluor, a trademark of Air Products and Chemicals, is a reagent in chemistry that is used as a fluorine donor. This compound is a derivative of the nucleophillic base DABCO. It is a colourless salt that tolerates air and even water. It has been commercialized for use for electrophilic fluorination.

== Preparation ==

Selectfluor is synthesized by the N-alkylation of diazabicyclo[2.2.2]octane (DABCO) with dichloromethane in a Menshutkin reaction, followed by ion exchange with sodium tetrafluoroborate (replacing the chloride counterion for the tetrafluoroborate). The resulting salt is treated with elemental fluorine and sodium tetrafluoroborate:

The cation is often depicted with one skewed ethylene ((CH_{2})_{2}) group. In fact, these pairs of CH_{2} groups are eclipsed so that the cation has idealized C_{3h} symmetry.

== Mechanism of fluorination ==
Electrophilic fluorinating reagents could in principle operate by electron transfer pathways or an S_{N}2 attack at fluorine. This distinction has not been decided. By using a charge-spin separated probe, it was possible to show that the electrophilic fluorination of stilbenes with Selectfluor proceeds through an SET/fluorine atom transfer mechanism.

In certain cases Selectfluor can transfer fluorine to alkyl radicals.

== Applications ==
The conventional source of "electrophilic fluorine", i.e. the equivalent to the superelectrophile F^{+}, is gaseous fluorine, which requires specialised equipment for manipulation. Selectfluor reagent is a salt, the use of which requires only routine procedures. Like F_{2}, the salt delivers the equivalent of F^{+}. It is mainly used in the synthesis of organofluorine compounds:

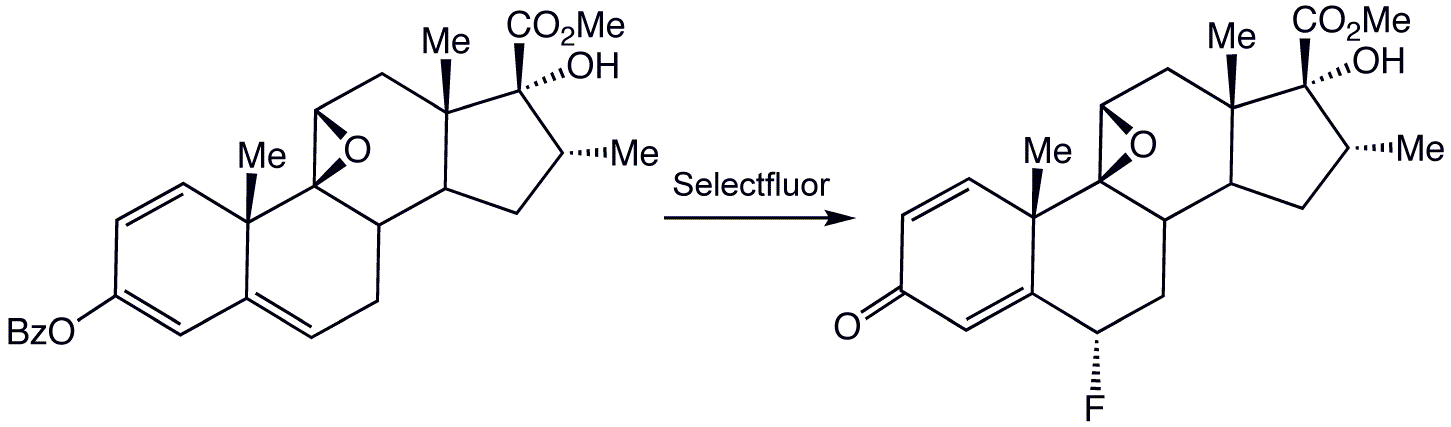

=== Specialized applications ===
Selectfluor reagent also serves as a strong oxidant, a property that is useful in other reactions in organic chemistry. Oxidation of alcohols and phenols. As applied to electrophilic iodination, Selectfluor reagent activates the I–I bond in I_{2} molecule.

== Related reagents ==
Similar to Selectfluor are N-fluorosulfonimides:

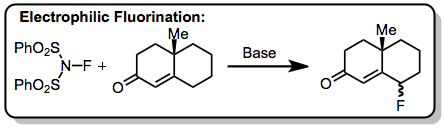

== Patents ==
- US 5459267 "1-substituted-4-fluoro-1,4-diazoniabicyclo[2.2.2]octane salts and their application as fluorinating agents"
- US 55227493 "Fluorinated Sulfonamide Derivatives"
- US 5086178 "Fluorinated Diazabicycloalkane Derivatives"
- US 5473065 "Fluorinated Diazabicycloalkane Derivatives"
- US 5442084 "Method of Selective Fluorination"
