= Halonium ion =

Any onium ion containing a halogen atom carrying a positive charge

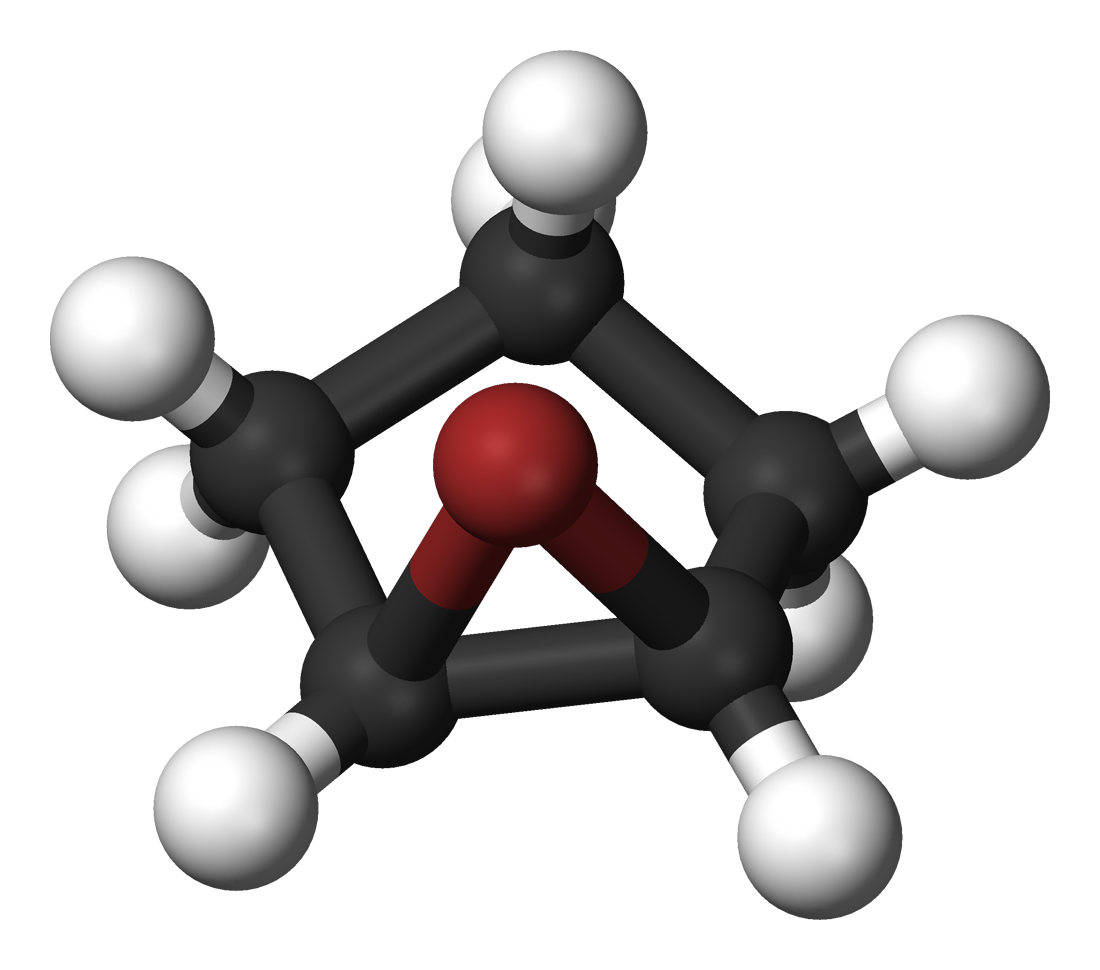
A ball-and-stick model of a bromonium ion formed from cyclopentene

A halonium ion is any onium ion containing a halogen atom carrying a positive charge. This cation has the general structure R−−R′ where X is any halogen and no restrictions on R, this structure can be cyclic or an open chain molecular structure. Halonium ions formed from fluorine, chlorine, bromine, and iodine are called fluoronium, chloronium, bromonium, and iodonium, respectively. The 3-membered cyclic variety commonly proposed as intermediates in electrophilic halogenation may be called haliranium ions, using the Hantzsch-Widman nomenclature system.

== Structure ==
The simplest halonium ions are of the structure H−−H (X = F, Cl, Br, I). Many halonium ions have a three-atom cyclic structure, similar to that of an epoxide, resulting from the formal addition of a halogenium ion X^{+} to a C=C double bond, as when a halogen is added to an alkene. The formation of 5-membered halonium ions (e.g., chlorolanium, bromolanium ions) via neighboring group participation is also well studied.

Diaryliodonium ions ([Ar_{2}I]^{+}X^{−}) are generally stable, isolable salts which exhibit a T-shaped geometry with the aryl groups at ~90 degrees apart; for more details, see hypervalent iodine.

The tendency to form bridging halonium ions is in the order I > Br > Cl > F. Whereas iodine and bromine readily form bridged iodonium and bromonium ions, fluoronium ions have only recently been characterized in designed systems that force close encounter of the fluorine lone pair and a carbocationic center. In practice, structurally, there is a continuum between a symmetrically bridged halonium, to an unsymmetrical halonium with a long weak bond to one of the carbon centers, to a true β-halocarbocation with no halonium character. The equilibrium structure depends on the ability of the carbon atoms and the halogen to accommodate positive charge. Thus, a bromonium ion that bridges a primary and tertiary carbon will often exhibit a skewed structure, with a weak bond to the tertiary center (with significant carbocation character) and stronger bond to the primary carbon. This is due to the increased stability of tertiary carbons to stabilize positive charge. In the more extreme case, if the tertiary center is doubly benzylic for instance, then the open form may be favored. Similarly, switching from bromine to chlorine also weakens bridging character, due to the higher electronegativity of chlorine and lower propensity to share electron density compared to bromine.

== Reactivity ==
These ions are usually only short-lived reaction intermediates; they are very reactive, owing to high ring strain in the three-membered ring and the positive charge on the halogen; this positive charge makes them great electrophiles. In almost all cases, the halonium ion is attacked by a nucleophile within a very short time. Even a weak nucleophile, such as water will attack the halonium ion; this is how halohydrins can be made.

On occasion, a halonium atom will rearrange to a carbocation. This usually occurs only when that carbocation is an allylic or a benzylic carbocation.

== History ==
Halonium ions were first postulated in 1937 by Roberts and Kimball to account for observed anti diastereoselectivity in halogen addition reactions to alkenes. They correctly argued that if the initial reaction intermediate in bromination is the open-chain X–C–C^{+} species, rotation around the C–C single bond would be possible leading to a mixture of equal amounts of dihalogen syn isomer and anti isomer, which is not the case. They also asserted that a positively charged halogen atom is isoelectronic with oxygen and that carbon and bromine have comparable ionization potentials. For certain aryl substituted alkenes, the anti stereospecificity is diminished or lost, as a result of weakened or absent halonium character in the cationic intermediate.

In 1970 George A. Olah succeeded in preparing and isolating halonium salts by adding a methyl halide such as methyl bromide or methyl chloride in sulfur dioxide at −78 °C to a complex of antimony pentafluoride and tetrafluoromethane in sulfur dioxide. After evaporation of sulfur dioxide this procedure left crystals of [H_{3}C––CH_{3}][SbF_{6}]^{–}, stable at room temperature but not to moisture. A fluoronium ion was recently characterized in solution phase (dissolved in sulfur dioxide or sulfuryl chloride fluoride) at low temperature.

Cyclic and acyclic chloronium, bromonium, and iodonium ions have been structurally characterised by X-ray crystallography, such as the bi(adamantylidene)-derived bromonium cation shown below.

skeletal formula	ball-and-stick model

Compounds containing trivalent or tetravalent halonium ions do not exist but for some hypothetical compounds stability has been computationally tested.
