= Acid =

Chemical compound giving a proton or accepting an electron pair

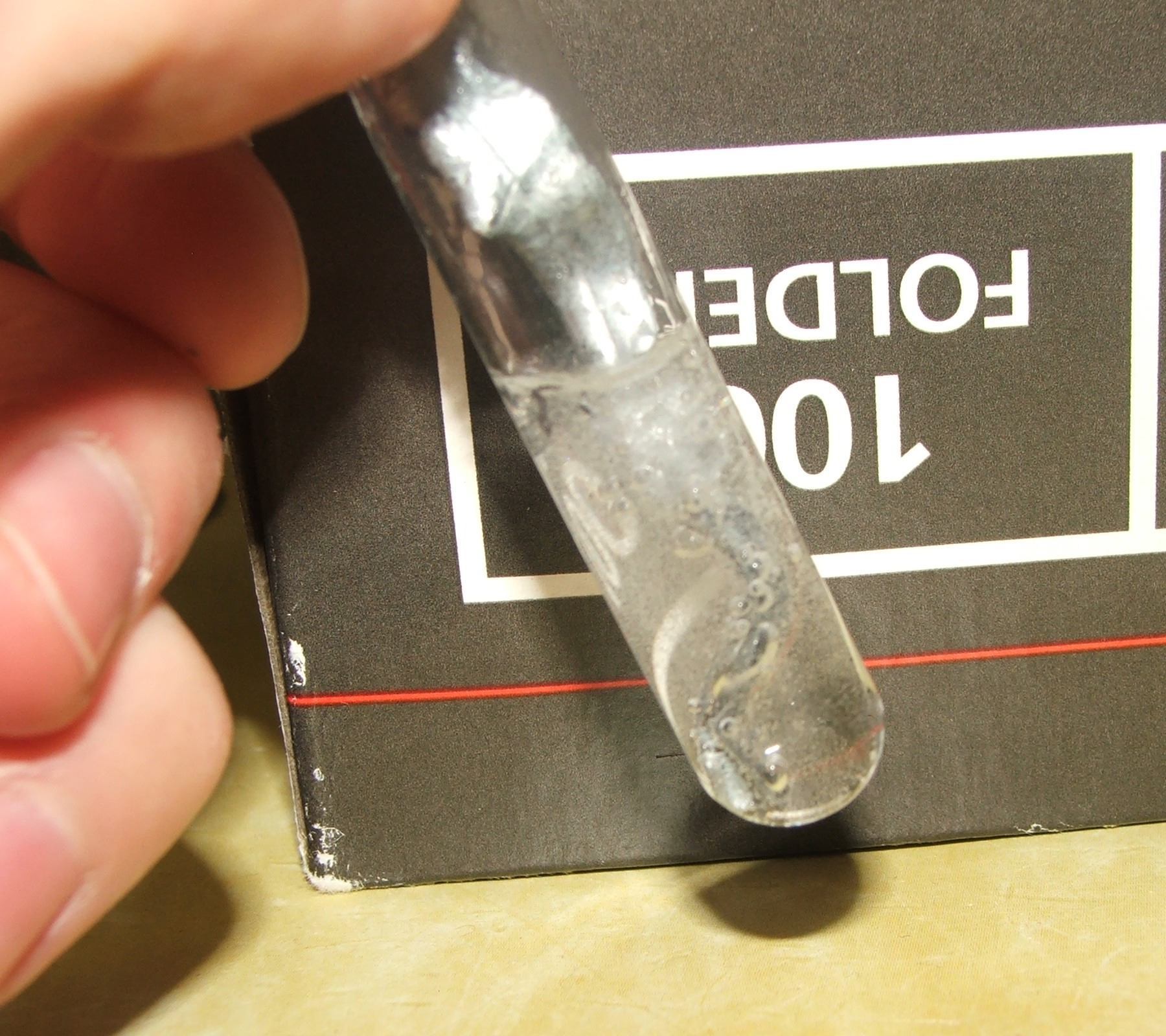
Zinc, a typical metal, reacting with hydrochloric acid, a typical acid

An acid is a molecule or ion capable of either donating a proton (i.e. hydrogen cation, H^{+}), known as a Brønsted–Lowry acid, or forming a covalent bond with an electron pair, known as a Lewis acid.

The first category of acids are the proton donors, or Brønsted–Lowry acids. In the special case of aqueous solutions, proton donors form the hydronium ion H_{3}O^{+} and are known as Arrhenius acids. Brønsted and Lowry generalized the Arrhenius theory to include non-aqueous solvents. A Brønsted–Lowry or Arrhenius acid usually contains a hydrogen atom bonded to a chemical structure that is still energetically favorable after loss of H^{+}.

Aqueous Arrhenius acids have characteristic properties that provide a practical description of an acid. Acids form aqueous solutions with a sour taste, can turn blue litmus red, and react with bases and certain metals (like calcium) to form salts. The word acid is derived from the Latin acidus, meaning 'sour'. An aqueous solution of an acid has a pH less than 7 and is colloquially also referred to as "acid" (as in "dissolved in acid"), while the strict definition refers only to the solute. A lower pH means a higher acidity, and thus a higher concentration of hydrogen cations in the solution. Chemicals or substances having the property of an acid are said to be acidic.

Common aqueous acids include hydrochloric acid (a solution of hydrogen chloride that is found in gastric acid in the stomach and activates digestive enzymes), acetic acid (vinegar is a dilute aqueous solution of this liquid), sulfuric acid (used in car batteries), and citric acid (found in citrus fruits). As these examples show, acids (in the colloquial sense) can be solutions or pure substances, and can be derived from acids (in the strict sense) that are solids, liquids, or gases. Strong acids and some concentrated weak acids are corrosive, but there are exceptions such as carboranes and boric acid.

The second category of acids are Lewis acids, which form a covalent bond with an electron pair. An example is boron trifluoride (BF_{3}), whose boron atom has a vacant orbital that can form a covalent bond by sharing a lone pair of electrons on an atom in a base, for example the nitrogen atom in ammonia (NH_{3}). Lewis considered this as a generalization of the Brønsted definition, so that an acid is a chemical species that accepts electron pairs either directly or by releasing protons (H^{+}) into the solution, which then accept electron pairs. Hydrogen chloride, acetic acid, and most other Brønsted–Lowry acids cannot form a covalent bond with an electron pair, however, and are therefore not Lewis acids. Conversely, many Lewis acids are not Arrhenius or Brønsted–Lowry acids. In modern terminology, an acid is implicitly a Brønsted acid and not a Lewis acid, since chemists almost always refer to a Lewis acid explicitly as such.

== Definitions and concepts ==
Modern definitions are concerned with the fundamental chemical reactions common to all acids.

Most acids encountered in everyday life are aqueous solutions, or can be dissolved in water, so the Arrhenius and Brønsted–Lowry definitions are the most relevant.

The Brønsted–Lowry definition is the most widely used definition; unless otherwise specified, acid–base reactions are assumed to involve the transfer of a proton (H^{+}) from an acid to a base.

Hydronium ions are acids according to all three definitions. Although alcohols and amines can be Brønsted–Lowry acids, they can also function as Lewis bases due to the lone pairs of electrons on their oxygen and nitrogen atoms.

=== Arrhenius acids ===
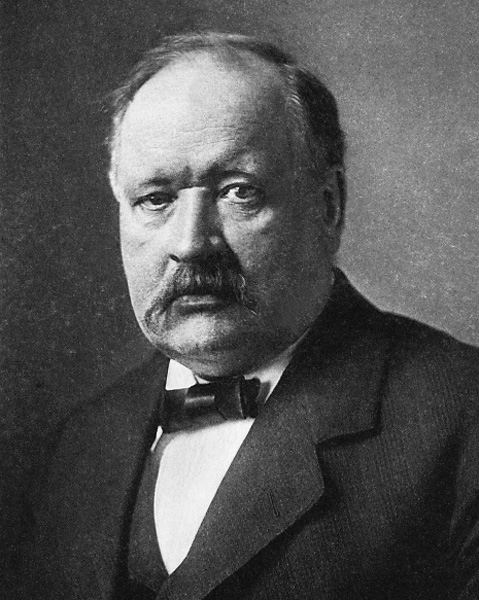
Svante Arrhenius

In 1884, Svante Arrhenius attributed the properties of acidity to hydrogen cations (H^{+}), later described as protons or hydrons. An Arrhenius acid is a substance that, when added to water, increases the concentration of H^{+} ions in the water. Chemists often write H^{+}(aq) and refer to the hydrogen cation when describing acid–base reactions but the free hydrogen nucleus, a proton, does not exist alone in water, it exists as the hydronium ion (H_{3}O^{+}) or other forms (H_{5}O_{2}^{+}, H_{9}O_{4}^{+}). Thus, an Arrhenius acid can also be described as a substance that increases the concentration of hydronium ions when added to water. Examples include molecular substances such as hydrogen chloride and acetic acid.

An Arrhenius base, on the other hand, is a substance that increases the concentration of hydroxide (OH^{−}) ions when dissolved in water. This decreases the concentration of hydronium because the ions react to form H_{2}O molecules:

H_{3}O^{+}_{(aq)} + OH^{−}_{(aq)} ⇌ H_{2}O_{(liq)} + H_{2}O_{(liq)}

Due to this equilibrium, any increase in the concentration of hydronium is accompanied by a decrease in the concentration of hydroxide. Thus, an Arrhenius acid could also be said to be one that decreases hydroxide concentration, while an Arrhenius base increases it.

In an acidic solution, the concentration of hydronium ions is greater than 10^{−7} moles per liter. Since pH is defined as the negative logarithm of the concentration of hydronium ions, acidic solutions thus have a pH of less than 7.

=== Brønsted–Lowry acids ===
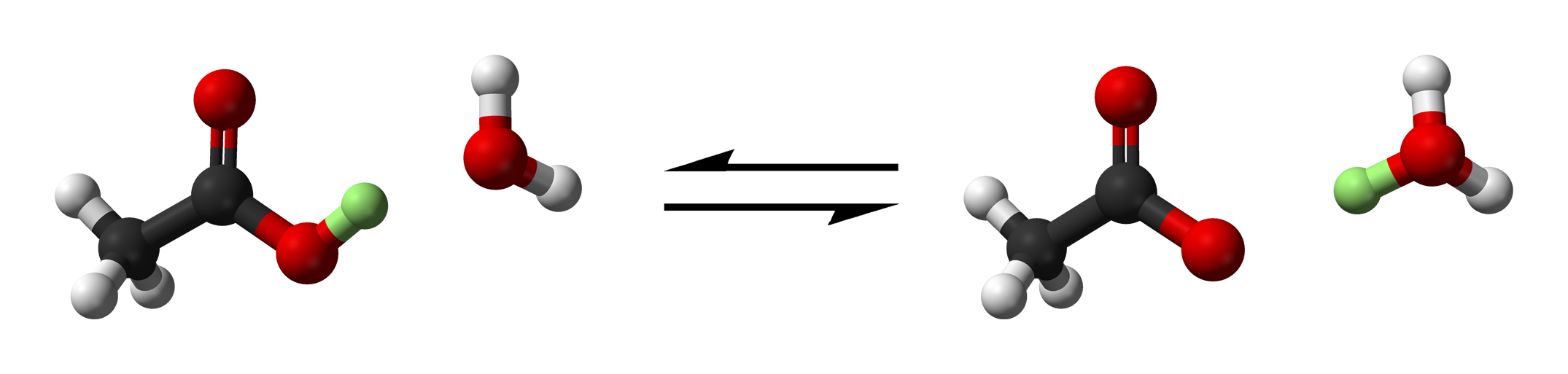
Acetic acid, a weak acid, donates a proton (hydrogen ion, highlighted in green) to water in an equilibrium reaction to give the acetate ion and the hydronium ion. Red: oxygen, black: carbon, white: hydrogen.

While the Arrhenius concept is useful for describing many reactions, it is also quite limited in its scope. In 1923, chemists Johannes Nicolaus Brønsted and Thomas Martin Lowry independently recognized that acid–base reactions involve the transfer of a proton. A Brønsted–Lowry acid (or simply Brønsted acid) is a species that donates a proton to a Brønsted–Lowry base. Brønsted–Lowry acid–base theory has several advantages over Arrhenius theory. Consider the following reactions of acetic acid (CH_{3}COOH), the organic acid that gives vinegar its characteristic taste:

CH_{3}COOH + H_{2}O ⇌ CH_{3}COO^{−} + H_{3}O^{+}
CH_{3}COOH + NH_{3} ⇌ CH_{3}COO^{−} + NH^{+}_{4}

Both theories easily describe the first reaction: CH_{3}COOH acts as an Arrhenius acid because it acts as a source of H_{3}O^{+} when dissolved in water, and it acts as a Brønsted acid by donating a proton to water. In the second example CH_{3}COOH undergoes the same transformation, in this case donating a proton to ammonia (NH_{3}), but does not relate to the Arrhenius definition of an acid because the reaction does not produce hydronium. Nevertheless, CH_{3}COOH is both an Arrhenius and a Brønsted–Lowry acid.

Brønsted–Lowry theory can be used to describe reactions of molecular compounds in nonaqueous solution or the gas phase. Hydrogen chloride (HCl) and ammonia combine under several different conditions to form ammonium chloride, NH_{4}Cl. In aqueous solution HCl behaves as hydrochloric acid and exists as hydronium and chloride ions. The following reactions illustrate the limitations of Arrhenius's definition:

1. H_{3}O^{+}_{(aq)} + Cl^{−}_{(aq)} + NH_{3} → Cl^{−}_{(aq)} + NH^{+}_{4}_{(aq)} + H_{2}O
2. HCl_{(benzene)} + NH_{3(benzene)} → NH_{4}Cl_{(s)}
3. HCl_{(g)} + NH_{3(g)} → NH_{4}Cl_{(s)}

As with the acetic acid reactions, both definitions work for the first example, where water is the solvent and hydronium ion is formed by the HCl solute. The next two reactions do not involve the formation of ions but are still proton-transfer reactions. In the second reaction hydrogen chloride and ammonia (dissolved in benzene) react to form solid ammonium chloride in a benzene solvent and in the third gaseous HCl and NH_{3} combine to form the solid.

=== Lewis acids ===
A third, only marginally related concept was proposed in 1923 by Gilbert N. Lewis, which includes reactions with acid–base characteristics that do not involve a proton transfer. A Lewis acid is a species that accepts a pair of electrons from another species; in other words, it is an electron pair acceptor. Brønsted acid–base reactions are proton transfer reactions while Lewis acid–base reactions are electron pair transfers. Many Lewis acids are not Brønsted–Lowry acids. Contrast how the following reactions are described in terms of acid–base chemistry:

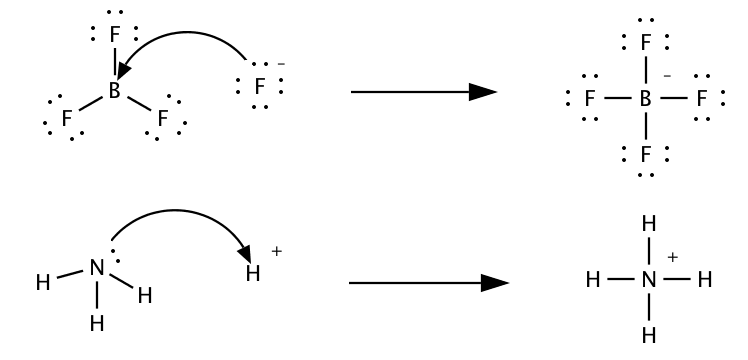

In the first reaction a fluoride ion, F^{−}, gives up an electron pair to boron trifluoride to form the product tetrafluoroborate. Fluoride "loses" a pair of valence electrons because the electrons shared in the B—F bond are located in the region of space between the two atomic nuclei and are therefore more distant from the fluoride nucleus than they are in the lone fluoride ion. BF_{3} is a Lewis acid because it accepts the electron pair from fluoride. This reaction cannot be described in terms of Brønsted theory because there is no proton transfer.

The second reaction can be described using either theory. A proton is transferred from an unspecified Brønsted acid to ammonia, a Brønsted base; alternatively, ammonia acts as a Lewis base and transfers a lone pair of electrons to form a bond with a hydrogen ion. The species that gains the electron pair is the Lewis acid; for example, the oxygen atom in H_{3}O^{+} gains a pair of electrons when one of the H—O bonds is broken and the electrons shared in the bond become localized on oxygen.

Depending on the context, a Lewis acid may also be described as an oxidizer or an electrophile. Organic Brønsted acids, such as acetic, citric, or oxalic acid, are not Lewis acids. They dissociate in water to produce a Lewis acid, H^{+}, but at the same time, they also yield an equal amount of a Lewis base (acetate, citrate, or oxalate, respectively, for the acids mentioned). This article deals mostly with Brønsted acids rather than Lewis acids.

== Dissociation and equilibrium ==
Reactions of acids are often generalized in the form HA ⇌ H^{+} + A^{−}, where HA represents the acid and A^{−} is the conjugate base. This reaction is referred to as protolysis. The protonated form (HA) of an acid is also sometimes referred to as the free acid.

Acid–base conjugate pairs differ by one proton and can be interconverted by the addition or removal of a proton (protonation and deprotonation, respectively). The acid can be the charged species, and the conjugate base can be neutral in which case the generalized reaction scheme could be written as HA^{+} ⇌ H^{+} + A. In solution there exists an equilibrium between the acid and its conjugate base. The equilibrium constant K is an expression of the equilibrium concentrations of the molecules or the ions in solution. Brackets indicate concentration, such that [H_{2}O] means the concentration of H_{2}O. The acid dissociation constant K_{a} is generally used in the context of acid–base reactions. The numerical value of K_{a} is equal to the product (multiplication) of the concentrations of the products divided by the concentration of the reactants, where the reactant is the acid (HA) and the products are the conjugate base and H^{+}.

$$K_a = \frac\ce{[H+] [A^{-}]}\ce{[HA]}$$

The stronger of two acids will have a higher K_{a} than the weaker acid; the ratio of hydrogen cations to acid will be higher for the stronger acid as the stronger acid has a greater tendency to lose its proton. Because the range of possible values for K_{a} spans many orders of magnitude, a more manageable constant, pK_{a} is more frequently used, where pK_{a} = −log_{10} K_{a}. Stronger acids have a smaller pK_{a} than weaker acids. Experimentally determined pK_{a} at 25 °C in aqueous solution are often quoted in textbooks and reference material.

== Nomenclature ==
Arrhenius acids are named according to their anions. In the classical naming system, the ionic suffix is dropped and replaced with a new suffix, according to the table following. The prefix "hydro-" is used when the acid is made up of just hydrogen and one other element. For example, HCl has chloride as its anion, so the hydro- prefix is used, and the -ide suffix makes the name take the form hydrochloric acid.

Classical naming system:

Anion prefix	Anion suffix	Acid prefix	Acid suffix	Example
per	ate	per	ic acid	perchloric acid (HClO_{4})
	ate		ic acid	chloric acid (HClO_{3})
	ite		ous acid	chlorous acid (HClO_{2})
hypo	ite	hypo	ous acid	hypochlorous acid (HClO)
	ide	hydro	ic acid	hydrochloric acid (HCl)

In the IUPAC naming system, "aqueous" is simply added to the name of the ionic compound. Thus, for hydrogen chloride, as an acid solution, the IUPAC name is aqueous hydrogen chloride.

== Acid strength ==
The strength of an acid refers to its ability or tendency to lose a proton. A strong acid is one that completely dissociates in water; in other words, one mole of a strong acid HA dissolves in water yielding one mole of H^{+} and one mole of the conjugate base, A^{−}, and none of the protonated acid HA. In contrast, a weak acid only partially dissociates and at equilibrium both the acid and the conjugate base are in solution. Examples of strong acids are hydrochloric acid (HCl), hydroiodic acid (HI), hydrobromic acid (HBr), perchloric acid (HClO_{4}), nitric acid (HNO_{3}) and sulfuric acid (H_{2}SO_{4}). In water, each of these essentially ionizes 100%. The stronger an acid is, the more easily it loses a proton, H^{+}. Two key factors that contribute to the ease of deprotonation are the polarity of the H—A bond and the size of atom A, which determines the strength of the H—A bond. Acid strengths are also often discussed in terms of the stability of the conjugate base.

Stronger acids have a larger acid dissociation constant, K_{a} and a lower pK_{a} than weaker acids.

Sulfonic acids, which are organic oxyacids, are a class of strong acids. A common example is toluenesulfonic acid (tosylic acid). Unlike sulfuric acid itself, sulfonic acids can be solids. In fact, polystyrene functionalized into polystyrene sulfonate is a solid strongly acidic plastic that is filterable.

Superacids are acids stronger than 100% sulfuric acid. Examples of superacids are fluoroantimonic acid, magic acid and perchloric acid. The strongest known acid is helium hydride ion, with a proton affinity of 177.8kJ/mol. Superacids can permanently protonate water to give ionic, crystalline hydronium "salts". They can also quantitatively stabilize carbocations.

While K_{a} measures the strength of an acid compound, the strength of an aqueous acid solution is measured by pH, which is an indication of the concentration of hydronium in the solution. The pH of a simple solution of an acid compound in water is determined by the dilution of the compound and the compound's K_{a}.

== Lewis acid strength in non-aqueous solutions ==
Lewis acids have been classified in the ECW model and it has been shown that there is no one order of acid strengths. The relative acceptor strength of Lewis acids toward a series of bases, versus other Lewis acids, can be illustrated by C-B plots. It has been shown that to define the order of Lewis acid strength at least two properties must be considered. For Pearson's qualitative HSAB theory the two properties are hardness and strength while for Drago's quantitative ECW model the two properties are electrostatic and covalent.

== Chemical characteristics ==
=== Monoprotic acids ===
Monoprotic acids, also known as monobasic acids, are those acids that are able to donate one proton per molecule during the process of dissociation (sometimes called ionization) as shown below (symbolized by HA):

HA (aq) + H_{2}O (l) ⇌ H_{3}O^{+} (aq) + A^{−} (aq) K_{a}

Common examples of monoprotic acids in mineral acids include hydrochloric acid (HCl) and nitric acid (HNO_{3}). On the other hand, for organic acids the term mainly indicates the presence of one carboxylic acid group and sometimes these acids are known as monocarboxylic acid. Examples in organic acids include formic acid (HCOOH), acetic acid (CH_{3}COOH) and benzoic acid (C_{6}H_{5}COOH).

=== Polyprotic acids ===
Polyprotic acids, also known as polybasic acids, are able to donate more than one proton per acid molecule, in contrast to monoprotic acids that only donate one proton per molecule. Specific types of polyprotic acids have more specific names, such as diprotic (or dibasic) acid (two potential protons to donate), and triprotic (or tribasic) acid (three potential protons to donate). Some macromolecules such as proteins and nucleic acids can have a very large number of acidic protons.

A diprotic acid (here symbolized by H_{2}A) can undergo one or two dissociations depending on the pH. Each dissociation has its own dissociation constant, K_{a1} and K_{a2}.

H_{2}A (aq) + H_{2}O (l) ⇌ H_{3}O^{+} (aq) + HA^{−} (aq) K_{a1}
HA^{−} (aq) + H_{2}O (l) ⇌ H_{3}O^{+} (aq) + A^{2−} (aq) K_{a2}

The first dissociation constant is typically greater than the second (i.e., K_{a1} > K_{a2}). For example, sulfuric acid (H_{2}SO_{4}) can donate one proton to form the bisulfate anion (HSO^{−}_{4}), for which K_{a1} is very large; then it can donate a second proton to form the sulfate anion (SO^{2−}_{4}), wherein the K_{a2} is intermediate strength. The large K_{a1} for the first dissociation makes sulfuric a strong acid. In a similar manner, the weak unstable carbonic acid (H_{2}CO_{3}) can lose one proton to form bicarbonate anion (HCO^{−}_{3}) and lose a second to form carbonate anion (CO^{2−}_{3}). Both K_{a} values are small, but K_{a1} > K_{a2} .

A triprotic acid (H_{3}A) can undergo one, two, or three dissociations and has three dissociation constants, where K_{a1} > K_{a2} > K_{a3}.

H_{3}A (aq) + H_{2}O (l) ⇌ H_{3}O^{+} (aq) + H_{2}A^{−} (aq) K_{a1}
H_{2}A^{−} (aq) + H_{2}O (l) ⇌ H_{3}O^{+} (aq) + HA^{2−} (aq) K_{a2}
HA^{2−} (aq) + H_{2}O (l) ⇌ H_{3}O^{+} (aq) + A^{3−} (aq) K_{a3}

An inorganic example of a triprotic acid is orthophosphoric acid (H_{3}PO_{4}), usually just called phosphoric acid. All three protons can be successively lost to yield H_{2}PO^{−}_{4}, then HPO^{2−}_{4}, and finally PO^{3−}_{4}, the orthophosphate ion, usually just called phosphate. Even though the positions of the three protons on the original phosphoric acid molecule are equivalent, the successive K_{a} values differ since it is energetically less favorable to lose a proton if the conjugate base is more negatively charged. An organic example of a triprotic acid is citric acid, which can successively lose three protons to finally form the citrate ion.

Although the subsequent loss of each hydrogen ion is less favorable, all of the conjugate bases are present in solution. The fractional concentration, α (alpha), for each species can be calculated. For example, a generic diprotic acid will generate 3 species in solution: H_{2}A, HA^{−}, and A^{2−}. The fractional concentrations can be calculated as below when given either the pH (which can be converted to the [H^{+}]) or the concentrations of the acid with all its conjugate bases:

$$\begin{align}
\alpha_\ce{H2A}   &= \frac{\ce{[H+]^2}}{\ce{[H+]^2}  + [\ce{H+}]K_1 + K_1 K_2}  = \frac{\ce{[H2A]}}{\ce{{[H2A]}} + [HA^-] + [A^{2-}]}\\
\alpha_\ce{HA^-}  &= \frac{[\ce{H+}]K_1}{\ce{[H+]^2} + [\ce{H+}]K_1 + K_1 K_2}  = \frac{\ce{[HA^-]}}{\ce{[H2A]}+{[HA^-]}+{[A^{2-}]}}\\
\alpha_\ce{A^{2-}}&= \frac{K_1 K_2}{\ce{[H+]^2} + [\ce{H+}]K_1 + K_1 K_2} = \frac{\ce{[A^{2-}]}}{\ce{{[H2A]}}+{[HA^-]}+{[A^{2-}]}}
\end{align}$$

A plot of these fractional concentrations against pH, for given K_{1} and K_{2}, is known as a Bjerrum plot. A pattern is observed in the above equations and can be expanded to the general n -protic acid that has been deprotonated i -times:

$$\alpha_{\ce H_{n-i} A^{i-} }= { {[\ce{H+}]^{n-i} \displaystyle \prod_{j=0}^{i}K_j} \over { \displaystyle \sum_{i=0}^n \Big[ [\ce{H+}]^{n-i} \displaystyle \prod_{j=0}^{i}K_j} \Big] }$$

where K_{0} = 1 and the other K-terms are the dissociation constants for the acid.

=== Neutralization ===
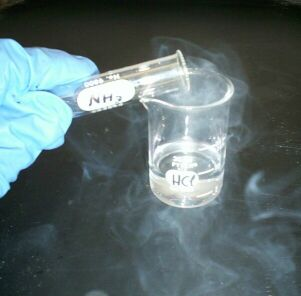
Hydrochloric acid (in beaker) reacting with ammonia fumes to produce ammonium chloride (white smoke)

Neutralization is the reaction between an acid and a base, producing a salt and neutralized base; for example, hydrochloric acid and sodium hydroxide form sodium chloride and water:

HCl_{(aq)} + NaOH_{(aq)} → H_{2}O_{(l)} + NaCl_{(aq)}

Neutralization is the basis of titration, where a pH indicator shows equivalence point when the equivalent number of moles of a base have been added to an acid. It is often wrongly assumed that neutralization should result in a solution with pH 7.0, which is only the case with similar acid and base strengths during a reaction.

Neutralization with a base weaker than the acid results in a weakly acidic salt. An example is the weakly acidic ammonium chloride, which is produced from the strong acid hydrogen chloride and the weak base ammonia. Conversely, neutralizing a weak acid with a strong base gives a weakly basic salt (e.g., sodium fluoride from hydrogen fluoride and sodium hydroxide).

=== Weak acid–weak base equilibrium ===
In order for a protonated acid to lose a proton, the pH of the system must rise above the pK_{a} of the acid. The decreased concentration of H^{+} in that basic solution shifts the equilibrium towards the conjugate base form (the deprotonated form of the acid). In lower-pH (more acidic) solutions, there is a high enough H^{+} concentration in the solution to cause the acid to remain in its protonated form.

Solutions of weak acids and salts of their conjugate bases form buffer solutions.

== Titration ==
To determine the concentration of an acid in an aqueous solution, an acid–base titration is commonly performed. A strong base solution with a known concentration, usually NaOH or KOH, is added to neutralize the acid solution according to the color change of the indicator with the amount of base added. The titration curve of an acid titrated by a base has two axes, with the base volume on the x-axis and the solution's pH value on the y-axis. The pH of the solution always goes up as the base is added to the solution.

=== Example: Diprotic acid ===
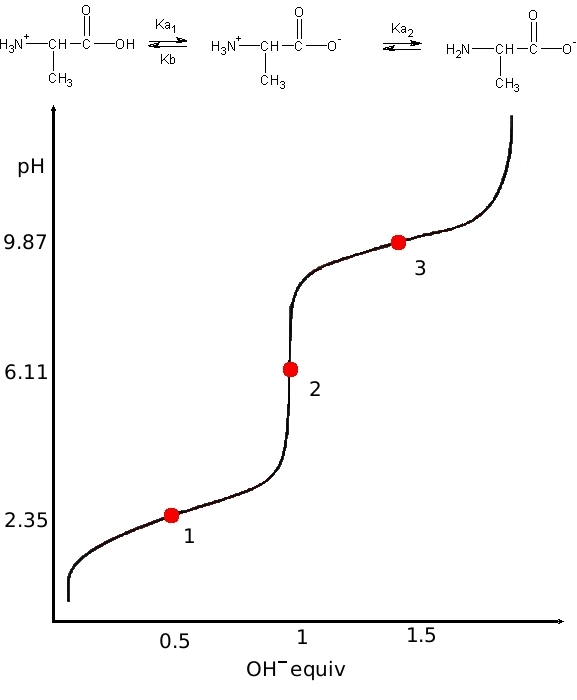
This is an ideal titration curve for alanine, a diprotic amino acid. Point 2 is the first equivalent point where the amount of NaOH added equals the amount of alanine in the original solution.

For each diprotic acid titration curve, from left to right, there are two midpoints, two equivalence points, and two buffer regions.

==== Equivalence points ====
Due to the successive dissociation processes, there are two equivalence points in the titration curve of a diprotic acid. The first equivalence point occurs when all first protons from the first ionization are titrated. In other words, the amount of OH^{−} added equals the original amount of H_{2}A at the first equivalence point. The second equivalence point occurs when all protons are titrated. Therefore, the amount of OH^{−} added equals twice the amount of H_{2}A at this time. For a weak diprotic acid titrated by a strong base, the second equivalence point must occur at pH above 7 due to the hydrolysis of the resulted salts in the solution. At either equivalence point, adding a drop of base will cause the steepest rise of the pH value in the system.

==== Buffer regions and midpoints ====
A titration curve for a diprotic acid contains two midpoints where pH=pK_{a}. Since there are two different K_{a} values, the first midpoint occurs at pH=pK_{a1} and the second one occurs at pH=pK_{a2}. Each segment of the curve that contains a midpoint at its center is called the buffer region. Because the buffer regions consist of the acid and its conjugate base, it can resist pH changes when base is added until the next equivalent points.

== Applications of acids ==
=== In industry ===
Acids are fundamental reagents in treating almost all processes in modern industry. Sulfuric acid, a diprotic acid, is the most widely used acid in industry, and is also the most-produced industrial chemical in the world. It is mainly used in producing fertilizer, detergent, batteries and dyes, as well as used in processing many products such like removing impurities. According to the statistics data in 2011, the annual production of sulfuric acid was around 200 million tonnes in the world. For example, phosphate minerals react with sulfuric acid to produce phosphoric acid for the production of phosphate fertilizers, and zinc is produced by dissolving zinc oxide into sulfuric acid, purifying the solution and electrowinning.

In the chemical industry, acids react in neutralization reactions to produce salts. For example, nitric acid reacts with ammonia to produce ammonium nitrate, a fertilizer. Additionally, carboxylic acids can be esterified with alcohols, to produce esters.

Acids are often used to remove rust and other corrosion from metals in a process known as pickling. They may be used as an electrolyte in a wet cell battery, such as sulfuric acid in a car battery.

=== In food ===
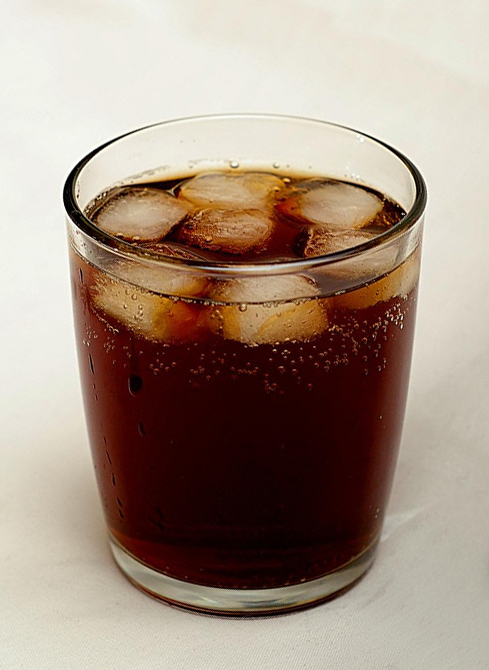
Carbonated water (H_{2}CO_{3} aqueous solution) is commonly added to soft drinks to make them effervesce.

Tartaric acid is an important component of some commonly used foods like unripe mangoes and tamarind. Natural fruits and vegetables also contain acids. Citric acid is present in oranges, lemon and other citrus fruits. Oxalic acid is present in tomatoes, spinach, and especially in carambola and rhubarb; rhubarb leaves and unripe carambolas are toxic because of high concentrations of oxalic acid. Ascorbic acid (Vitamin C) is an essential vitamin for the human body and is present in such foods as amla (Indian gooseberry), lemon, citrus fruits, and guava.

Many acids can be found in various kinds of food as additives, as they alter their taste and serve as preservatives. Phosphoric acid, for example, is a component of cola drinks. Acetic acid is used in day-to-day life as vinegar. Citric acid is used as a preservative in sauces and pickles.

Carbonic acid is one of the most common acid additives that are widely added in soft drinks. During the manufacturing process, CO_{2} is usually pressurized to dissolve in these drinks to generate carbonic acid. Carbonic acid is very unstable and tends to decompose into water and CO_{2} at room temperature and pressure. Therefore, when bottles or cans of these kinds of soft drinks are opened, the soft drinks fizz and effervesce as CO_{2} bubbles come out.

Certain acids are used as drugs. Acetylsalicylic acid (Aspirin) is used as a pain killer and for bringing down fevers.

=== In human bodies ===
Acids play important roles in the human body. The hydrochloric acid present in the stomach aids digestion by breaking down large and complex food molecules. Amino acids are required for synthesis of proteins required for growth and repair of body tissues. Fatty acids are also required for growth and repair of body tissues. Nucleic acids are important for the manufacturing of DNA and RNA and transmitting of traits to offspring through genes. Carbonic acid is important for maintenance of pH equilibrium in the body.

Human bodies contain a variety of organic and inorganic compounds, among those dicarboxylic acids play an essential role in many biological behaviors. Many of those acids are amino acids, which mainly serve as materials for the synthesis of proteins. Other weak acids serve as buffers with their conjugate bases to keep the body's pH from undergoing large scale changes that would be harmful to cells. The rest of the dicarboxylic acids also participate in the synthesis of various biologically important compounds in human bodies.

=== Acid catalysis ===
Acids are used as catalysts in industrial and organic chemistry; for example, sulfuric acid is used in very large quantities in the alkylation process to produce gasoline. Some acids, such as sulfuric, phosphoric, and hydrochloric acids, also effect dehydration and condensation reactions. In biochemistry, many enzymes employ acid catalysis.

== Biological occurrence ==
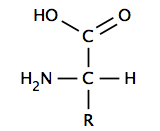
Basic structure of an amino acid

Many biologically important molecules are acids. Nucleic acids, which contain acidic phosphate groups, include DNA and RNA. Nucleic acids contain the genetic code that determines many of an organism's characteristics, and is passed from parents to offspring. DNA contains the chemical blueprint for the synthesis of proteins, which are made up of amino acid subunits. Cell membranes contain fatty acid esters such as phospholipids.

An α-amino acid has a central carbon (the α or alpha carbon) that is covalently bonded to a carboxyl group (thus they are carboxylic acids), an amino group, a hydrogen atom and a variable group. The variable group, also called the R group or side chain, determines the identity and many of the properties of a specific amino acid. In glycine, the simplest amino acid, the R group is a hydrogen atom, but in all other amino acids it is contains one or more carbon atoms bonded to hydrogens, and may contain other elements such as sulfur, oxygen or nitrogen. With the exception of glycine, naturally occurring amino acids are chiral and almost invariably occur in the L-configuration. Peptidoglycan, found in some bacterial cell walls contains some D-amino acids. At physiological pH, typically around 7, free amino acids exist in a charged form, where the acidic carboxyl group (-COOH) loses a proton (-COO^{−}) and the basic amine group (-NH_{2}) gains a proton (-NH^{+}_{3}). The entire molecule has a net neutral charge and is a zwitterion, with the exception of amino acids with basic or acidic side chains. Aspartic acid, for example, possesses one protonated amine and two deprotonated carboxyl groups, for a net charge of −1 at physiological pH.

Fatty acids and fatty acid derivatives are another group of carboxylic acids that play a significant role in biology. These contain long hydrocarbon chains and a carboxylic acid group on one end. The cell membrane of nearly all organisms is primarily made up of a phospholipid bilayer, a micelle of hydrophobic fatty acid esters with polar, hydrophilic phosphate "head" groups. Membranes contain additional components, some of which can participate in acid–base reactions.

In humans and many other animals, hydrochloric acid is a part of the gastric acid secreted within the stomach to help hydrolyze proteins and polysaccharides, as well as converting the inactive pro-enzyme, pepsinogen into the enzyme, pepsin. Some organisms produce acids for defense; for example, ants produce formic acid.

Acid–base equilibrium plays a critical role in regulating mammalian breathing. Oxygen gas (O_{2}) drives cellular respiration, the process by which animals release the chemical potential energy stored in food, producing carbon dioxide (CO_{2}) as a byproduct. Oxygen and carbon dioxide are exchanged in the lungs, and the body responds to changing energy demands by adjusting the rate of ventilation. For example, during periods of exertion the body rapidly breaks down stored carbohydrates and fat, releasing CO_{2} into the blood stream. In aqueous solutions such as blood CO_{2} exists in equilibrium with carbonic acid and bicarbonate ion.

CO_{2} + H_{2}O ⇌ H_{2}CO_{3} ⇌ H^{+} + HCO^{−}_{3}

It is the decrease in pH that signals the brain to breathe faster and deeper, expelling the excess CO_{2} and resupplying the cells with O_{2}.

Aspirin (acetylsalicylic acid) is a carboxylic acid.

Cell membranes are generally impermeable to charged or large, polar molecules because of the lipophilic fatty acyl chains comprising their interior. Many biologically important molecules, including a number of pharmaceutical agents, are organic weak acids that can cross the membrane in their protonated, uncharged form but not in their charged form (i.e., as the conjugate base). For this reason, the activity of many drugs can be enhanced or inhibited by the use of antacids or acidic foods. The charged form, however, is often more soluble in blood and cytosol, both aqueous environments. When the extracellular environment is more acidic than the neutral pH within the cell, certain acids will exist in their neutral form and will be membrane soluble, allowing them to cross the phospholipid bilayer. Acids that lose a proton at the intracellular pH will exist in their soluble, charged form and are thus able to diffuse through the cytosol to their target. Ibuprofen, aspirin and penicillin are examples of drugs that are weak acids.

== Common acids ==
=== Mineral acids (inorganic acids) ===
- Hydrogen halides and their solutions: hydrofluoric acid (HF), hydrochloric acid (HCl), hydrobromic acid (HBr), hydroiodic acid (HI)
- Halogen oxoacids: hypochlorous acid (HClO), chlorous acid (HClO_{2}), chloric acid (HClO_{3}), perchloric acid (HClO_{4}), and corresponding analogs for bromine and iodine
  - Hypofluorous acid (HFO), the only known oxoacid for fluorine.
- Sulfuric acid (H_{2}SO_{4})
- Fluorosulfuric acid (HSO_{3}F)
- Nitric acid (HNO_{3})
- Phosphoric acid (H_{3}PO_{4})
- Fluoroantimonic acid (HSbF_{6})
- Fluoroboric acid (HBF_{4})
- Hexafluorophosphoric acid (HPF_{6})
- Chromic acid (H_{2}CrO_{4})
- Boric acid (H_{3}BO_{3})

=== Sulfonic acids ===
A sulfonic acid has the general formula RS(=O)_{2}–OH, where R is an organic radical.

- Methanesulfonic acid (or mesylic acid, CH_{3}SO_{3}H)
- Ethanesulfonic acid (or esylic acid, CH_{3}CH_{2}SO_{3}H)
- Benzenesulfonic acid (or besylic acid, C_{6}H_{5}SO_{3}H)
- p-Toluenesulfonic acid (or tosylic acid, CH_{3}C_{6}H_{4}SO_{3}H)
- Trifluoromethanesulfonic acid (or triflic acid, CF_{3}SO_{3}H)
- Polystyrene sulfonic acid (sulfonated polystyrene, [CH_{2}CH(C_{6}H_{4})SO_{3}H]_{n})

=== Carboxylic acids ===
A carboxylic acid has the general formula R-C(O)OH, where R is an organic radical. The carboxyl group -C(O)OH contains a carbonyl group, C=O, and a hydroxyl group, O-H.

- Acetic acid (CH_{3}COOH)
- Citric acid (C_{6}H_{8}O_{7})
- Formic acid (HCOOH)
- Gluconic acid HOCH_{2}-(CHOH)_{4}-COOH
- Lactic acid (CH_{3}-CHOH-COOH)
- Oxalic acid (HOOC-COOH)
- Tartaric acid (HOOC-CHOH-CHOH-COOH)

=== Halogenated carboxylic acids ===
Halogenation at alpha position increases acid strength, so that the following acids are all stronger than acetic acid.

- Fluoroacetic acid
- Trifluoroacetic acid
- Chloroacetic acid
- Dichloroacetic acid
- Trichloroacetic acid

=== Vinylogous carboxylic acids ===
Normal carboxylic acids are the direct union of a carbonyl group and a hydroxyl group. In vinylogous carboxylic acids, a carbon-carbon double bond separates the carbonyl and hydroxyl groups.

- Ascorbic acid

=== Nucleic acids ===
- Deoxyribonucleic acid (DNA)
- Ribonucleic acid (RNA)
