= Fluoroantimonic acid =

Chemical compound

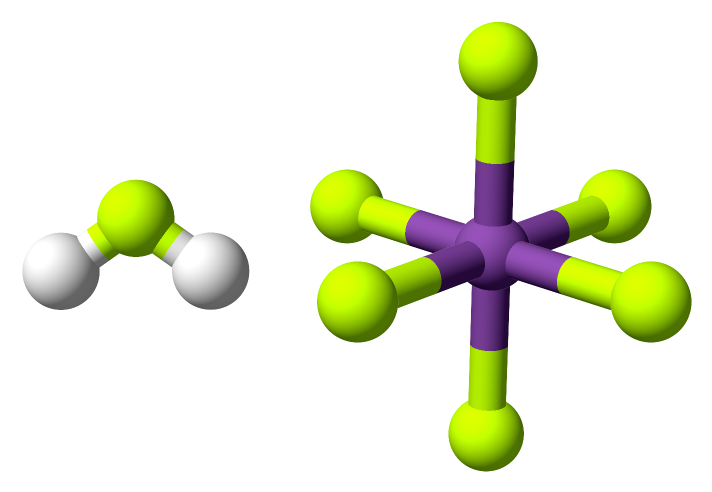

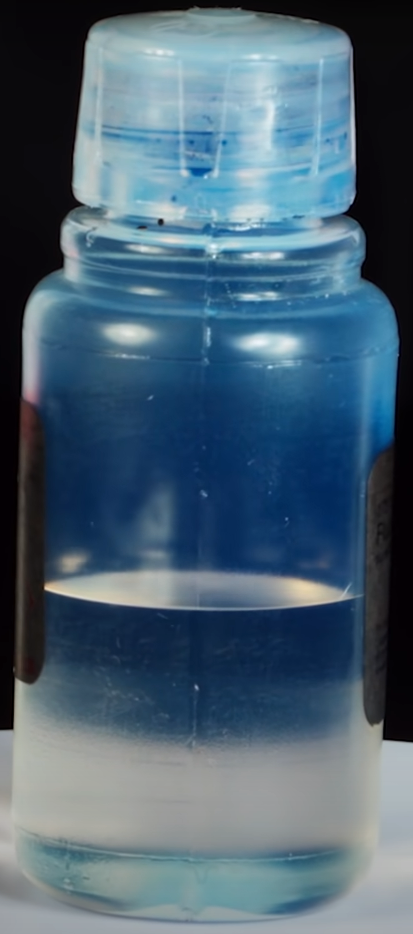
- Fluoroantimonic acid stored in a PFA bottle

Names
- IUPAC name Fluoroantimonic acid
- Systematic IUPAC name Hexafluoroantimonic acid
- Other names: Fluoroantimonic(V) acid; Hydrogen Fluoroantimonate; Hydrogen Hexafluoroantimonate; Fluoronium Fluoroantimonate; Fluoronium Hexafluoroantimonate

Identifiers
CAS Number	16950-06-4 (HSbF_{6})
3D model (JSmol)	Interactive image
ChemSpider	32741664
ECHA InfoCard	100.037.279
EC Number	241-023-8
PubChem CID	11118066 wrong formula
CompTox Dashboard (EPA)	DTXSID10894750
- InChI: InChI=1S/FH2.6FH.Sb/h1H2;6*1H;/q+1;;;;;;;+5/p-6 Key: HBGBSIVYTBPVEU-UHFFFAOYSA-H
- SMILES: [FH2+].F[Sb-](F)(F)(F)(F)F

Properties
Molar mass	236.756 g/mol
Appearance	Colorless liquid
Density	2.885 g/cm^{3}
Boiling point	40 °C (104 °F; 313 K) (decomposes)
Solubility in water	Reacts with water
Solubility in sulfuryl chloride fluoride	soluble
Solubility in sulfur dioxide	soluble
Vapor pressure	19 hPa (18 °C (64 °F; 291 K))

Hazards
- Occupational safety and health (OHS/OSH)
Main hazards	Extremely corrosive, toxic, reacts violently with water.
- GHS labelling
Pictograms	(GHS05: Corrosive) (GHS06: Toxic) (GHS09: Environmental hazard) (GHS07: Exclamation mark) (GHS08: Health hazard)
Signal word	Danger
Hazard statements	H300+H310+H330, H314, H411
Precautionary statements	P260, P262, P264, P270, P271, P273, P280, P284, P301+P310+P330, P301+P330+P331, P302+P350, P303+P361+P353, P304+P340+P310, P305+P351+P338+P310, P362, P391, P403+P233, P405, P501
NFPA 704 (fire diamond)	4 0 4 W; OX
Threshold limit value (TLV)	0.5 mg/m^{3} (TWA)
- NIOSH (US health exposure limits)
PEL (Permissible)	0.5 mg/m^{3}
REL (Recommended)	0.5 mg/m^{3} (TWA)

Related compounds
Related acids	Antimony pentafluoride; Hydrogen fluoride; Magic acid
- Except where otherwise noted, data are given for materials in their standard state (at 25 °C [77 °F], 100 kPa). verify (what is ?) Infobox references

Fluoroantimonic acid is a mixture of hydrogen fluoride and antimony pentafluoride, containing various cations and anions, the simplest being fluoronium (H_{2}F^{+}) and fluoroantimonate (SbF^{−}_{6}). The mixture is the strongest known superacid, stronger than pure sulfuric acid by many orders of magnitude, according to its Hammett acidity function. It even protonates some hydrocarbons to afford pentacoordinate carbocations (carbonium ions). Like its precursor hydrogen fluoride, it attacks glass, but can be stored in containers lined with PTFE (Teflon).

== Chemical composition ==
Fluoroantimonic acid is formed by combining hydrogen fluoride and antimony pentafluoride:

SbF_{5} + 2 HF ⇌ SbF^{−}_{6} + H_{2}F^{+}

The speciation (i.e., the inventory of components) of fluoroantimonic acid is complex. Spectroscopic measurements show that fluoroantimonic acid consists of a mixture of HF-solvated protons, [(HF)_{n}H]^{+} (such as H_{3}F^{+}_{2}), and SbF_{5}-adducts of fluoride, [(SbF_{5})_{n}F]^{−} (such as Sb_{4}F^{−}_{21}). Thus, the formula "[H_{2}F]^{+}[SbF_{6}]^{−}" is a convenient but oversimplified approximation of the true composition.

Nevertheless, the extreme acidity of this mixture is evident from the inferior proton-accepting ability of the species present in solution. Hydrogen fluoride, a weak acid in aqueous solution that is normally not thought to have any appreciable Brønsted basicity at all, is in fact the strongest Brønsted base in the mixture, protonating to H_{2}F^{+} in the same way water protonates to H_{3}O^{+} in aqueous acid. It is the fluoronium ion that accounts for fluoroantimonic acid's extreme acidity. The protons easily migrate through the solution, moving from H_{2}F^{+} to HF, when present, by the Grotthuss mechanism.

Two related products have been crystallized from HF−SbF_{5} mixtures, and both have been analyzed by single crystal X-ray crystallography. These salts have the formulas [H_{2}F^{+}][Sb_{2}F^{−}_{11}] and [H_{3}F^{+}_{2}][Sb_{2}F^{−}_{11}]. In both salts, the anion is Sb_{2}F^{−}_{11}. As mentioned above, SbF^{−}_{6} is weakly basic; the larger anion Sb_{2}F^{−}_{11} is expected to be a still weaker base.

== Acidity ==
Fluoroantimonic acid is the strongest superacid based on the measured value of its Hammett acidity function (H_{0}), which has been determined for various ratios of HF:SbF_{5}. The H_{0} of HF is −15.1±0.1. Solutions of HF have H_{0} values ranging from −20 to −22±1 as the molar percentage of SbF_{5} rises from 1% to over 50%. The lowest attained H_{0} is about −28 (although some sources have reported values below −31.)

The following H_{0} values provide a comparison to other superacids.

Acidities of selected superacids (Note: Increased acidity is indicated by lower (in this case, more negative) values of H_{0}.)
Compound	H_{0} (high value)	H_{0} (low value)
Fluoroantimonic acid	−23	−28
Magic acid	−23	
Carborane acid	−18	—
Fluorosulfuric acid	−15	
Triflic acid	−15	
Perchloric acid	−13	

Of the above, only the carborane acids, whose H_{0} could not be directly determined due to their high melting points, may be stronger acids than fluoroantimonic acid.

The H_{0} value measures the protonating ability of the bulk, liquid acid, and this value has been directly determined or estimated for various compositions of the mixture. The pK_{a} on the other hand, measures the equilibrium of proton dissociation of a discrete chemical species when dissolved in a particular solvent. Since fluoroantimonic acid is not a single chemical species, its pK_{a} value is not well-defined.

The gas-phase acidity (GPA) of individual species present in the mixture have been calculated using density functional theory methods. (Solution-phase pK_{a}s of these species can, in principle, be estimated by taking into account solvation energies, but do not appear to be reported in the literature as of 2019.) For example, the ion-pair [H_{2}F]^{+}·[SbF_{6}]^{−} was estimated to have a GPA of 1,060 kJ/mol. For comparison, the commonly encountered superacid triflic acid, TfOH, is a substantially weaker acid by this measure, with a GPA of 1,250 kJ/mol. However, certain carborane superacids have GPAs lower than that of [H_{2}F]^{+}·[SbF_{6}]^{−}. For example, H(CHB_{11}Cl_{11}) has an experimentally determined GPA of 1,010 kJ/mol.

== Reactions ==
Fluoroantimonic acid solution is so reactive that it is challenging to identify media where it is unreactive. Materials compatible as solvents for fluoroantimonic acid include sulfuryl chloride fluoride (SO_{2}ClF), and sulfur dioxide (SO_{2}); some chlorofluorocarbons have also been used. Containers for HF−SbF_{5} are made of PTFE.

Fluoroantimonic acid solutions decompose when heated, generating free hydrogen fluoride gas and liquid antimony pentafluoride at a temperature of 40 °C (104 °F).

As a superacid, fluoroantimonic acid solutions protonate nearly all organic compounds, often causing dehydrogenation, or dehydration. In 1967, Bickel and Hogeveen showed that 2HF·SbF_{5} reacts with isobutane and neopentane to form carbenium ions:

(CH_{3})_{3}CH + H^{+} → (CH_{3})_{3}C^{+} + H_{2}
(CH_{3})_{4}C + H^{+} → (CH_{3})_{3}C^{+} + CH_{4}

It is also used in the synthesis of tetraxenonogold complexes.

== Safety ==
HF−SbF_{5} is a highly corrosive substance that reacts violently with water. Heating it is dangerous as well, as it decomposes into toxic hydrogen fluoride.

== See also ==
- Fluoroboric acid
- Fluorosulfuric acid
- Hexafluorophosphoric acid
