= Carborane acid =

Class of chemical compounds

Carborane acids H[CXB_{11}Y_{5}Z_{6}]
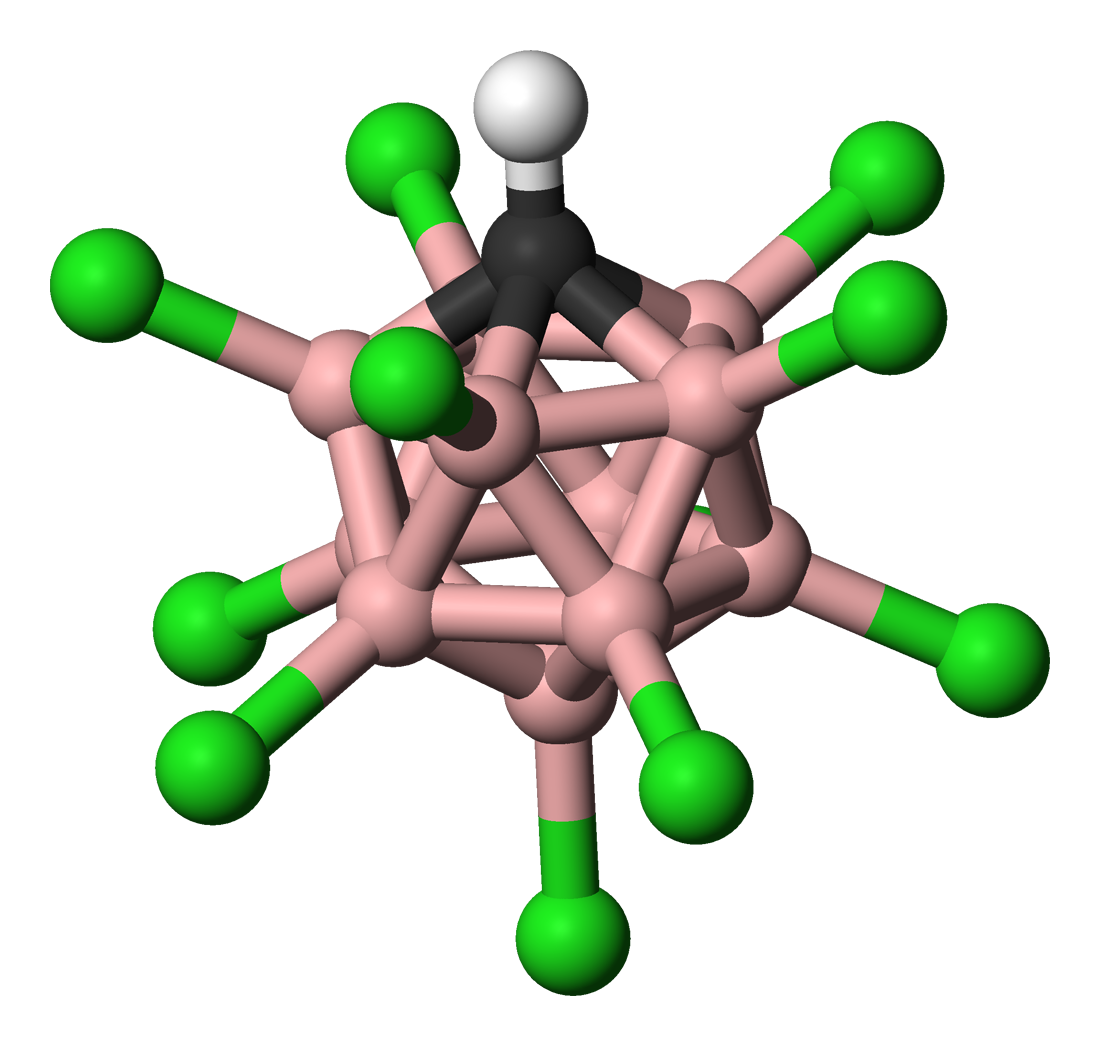
- Ball-and-stick model of [CHB_{11}Cl_{11}]^{−} (Chlorinated carborane acid). (Acidic proton not displayed). Colour scheme: hydrogen − white, chlorine − green, boron − pink, carbon − black.

Identifiers
3D model (JSmol)	Interactive image
- InChI: InChI=1S/CHB11Cl11.H/c13-2-1-3(2,14)5(1,16)6(1,17)4(1,2,15)8(2,19)7(2,3,18)9(3,5,20)11(5,6,22)10(4,6,8,21)12(7,8,9,11)23;/h1H; Key: HUAJRBVWWAXTQN-UHFFFAOYSA-N
- SMILES: [H].[CH]1234[B]([Cl])56%10[B]([Cl])17%11[B]([Cl])28%12[B]([Cl])39%13[B]([Cl])415[B]([Cl])620[B]([Cl])37%10[B]([Cl])48%11[B]([Cl])59%12[B]([Cl])01%13[B]([Cl])2345
- Except where otherwise noted, data are given for materials in their standard state (at 25 °C [77 °F], 100 kPa). Infobox references

Carborane acids H(CXB_{11}Y_{5}Z_{6}) (X, Y, Z = H, Alk, F, Cl, Br, CF_{3}) are a class of superacids, (Note: The image the acidic proton is not the one bonded to the carborane but that it is the counterion not displayed.) some of which are estimated to be at least one million times stronger than 100% pure sulfuric acid in terms of their Hammett acidity function values (H_{0} ≤ −18) and possess computed pK_{a} values well below −20, establishing them as some of the strongest known Brønsted acids. (Note: That is, were it liquid, the protonating ability of a neat sample of the carborane superacid, as measured by the activity of H^{+}, would be a million times higher than that of 100% sulfuric acid.) The best-studied example is the highly chlorinated derivative H(CHB_{11}Cl_{11}). The acidity of H(CHB_{11}Cl_{11}) was found to vastly exceed that of triflic acid, CF_{3}SO_{3}H, and bistriflimide, (CF_{3}SO_{2})_{2}NH, compounds previously regarded as the strongest isolable acids.

Their high acidities stem from the extensive delocalization of their conjugate bases, carboranate anions (CXB_{11}Y_{5}Z_{6}^{−}), which are usually further stabilized by electronegative groups like Cl, F, and CF_{3}. Due to the lack of oxidizing properties and the exceptionally low nucleophilicity and high stability of their conjugate bases, they are the only superacids known to protonate C_{60} fullerene without decomposing it. Additionally, they form stable, isolable salts with protonated benzene, C_{6}H_{7}^{+}, the parent compound of the Wheland intermediates encountered in electrophilic aromatic substitution reactions.

The fluorinated carborane acid, H(CHB_{11}F_{11}), is even stronger than chlorinated carborane acid. It is able to protonate butane to form tert-butyl cation at room temperature and is the only known acid to protonate carbon dioxide to give the bridged cation, [H(CO_{2})_{2}]^{+}, making it possibly the strongest known acid. In particular, CO_{2} does not undergo observable protonation when treated with the mixed superacids HF-SbF_{5} or HSO_{3}F-SbF_{5}.

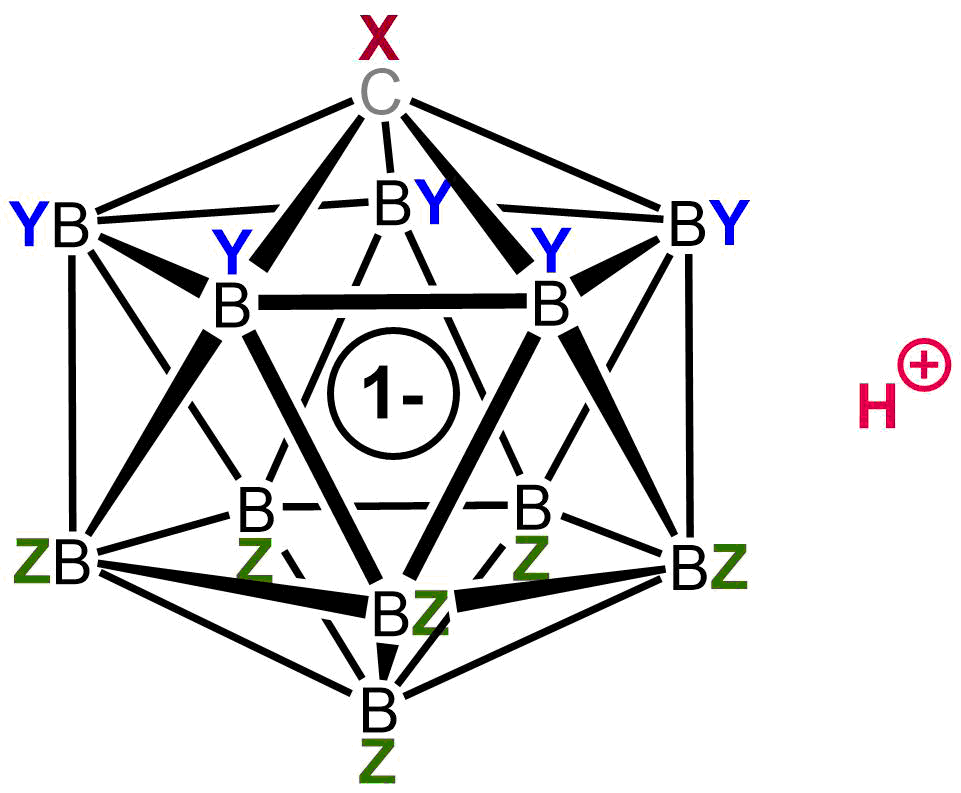
The generic structure of a carborane acid exhibits up to three different types of substituents X, Y, and Z. The position of the acidic proton will depend on the substituents and is shown here in a generic location.

As a class, the carborane acids form the most acidic group of well-defined, isolable substances known, far more acidic than previously known single-component strong acids like triflic acid or perchloric acid. In certain cases, like the nearly perhalogenated derivatives mentioned above, their acidities rival (and possibly exceed) those of the traditional mixed Lewis-Brønsted superacids like magic acid and fluoroantimonic acid. (However, a head-to-head comparison has not been possible thus far, due to the lack of a measure of acidity that is suitable for both classes of acids: pK_{a} values are ill-defined for the chemically complex mixed acids while H_{0} values cannot be measured for the very high melting carborane acids).

== Acidity ==
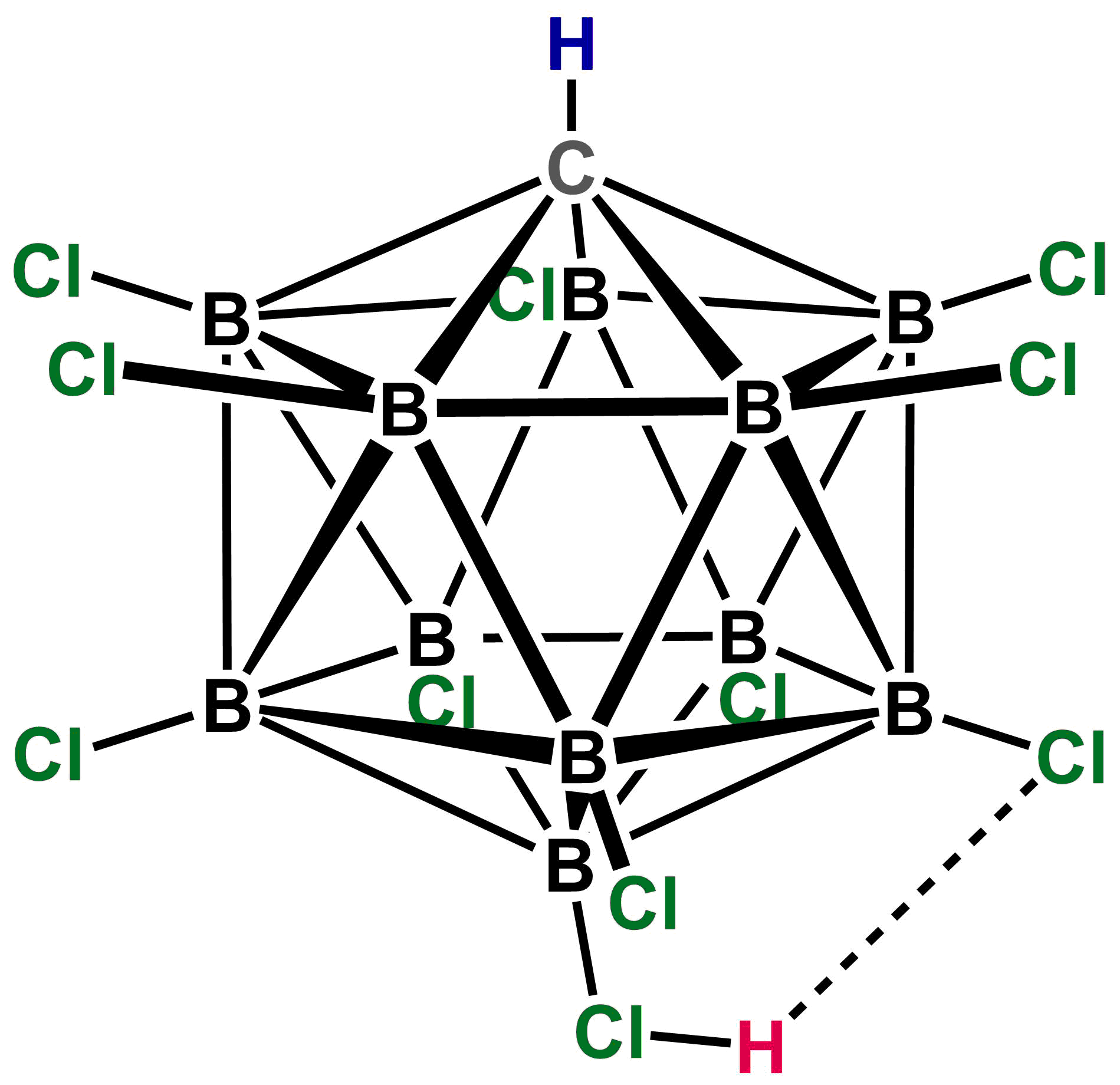
The carborane acid H(CHB_{11}Cl_{11}) was shown to be monomeric in the gas phase, with the acidic proton (shown in red) bound to Cl(12) and secondarily bonded to Cl(7). The monomeric form is metastable when condensed, but eventually polymerizes to give a structure with the acid proton bridging between carborane units. (Note: The lines between the carbon and boron atoms of the carborane core show connectivity but should not be interpreted to be single bonds. The bond orders are less than one, due to electron deficiency.)

A Brønsted–Lowry acid's strength corresponds with its ability to release a hydrogen ion. One common measure of acid strength for concentrated, superacidic liquid media is the Hammett acidity function, H_{0}. Based on its ability to quantitatively protonate benzene, the chlorinated carborane acid H(CHB_{11}Cl_{11}) was conservatively estimated to have an H_{0} value at or below −18, leading to the common assertion that carborane acids are at least a million times stronger than 100% sulfuric acid (H_{0} = −12). However, since the H_{0} value measures the protonating ability of a liquid medium, the crystalline and high-melting nature of these acids precludes direct measurement of this parameter. In terms of pK_{a}, a slightly different measure of acidity defined as the ability of a given solute to undergo ionization in a solvent, carborane acids are estimated to have pK_{a} values below −20, even without electron-withdrawing substituents on the boron atoms (e.g., H(CHB_{11}H_{11}) is estimated to have a pK_{a} of −24), (Note: The pK_{a} values are calculated for 1,2-dichloroethane as the solvent, with the pK_{a} of picric acid 'anchored' to 0 for convenience. Since the aqueous pK_{a} of picric acid is 0.4, these calculated values give a crude estimate of the pK_{a} of carboranes in water.) with the (yet unknown) fully fluorinated analog H(CB_{11}F_{12}) having a calculated pK_{a} of −46. The known acid H(CHB_{11}F_{11}) with one fewer fluorine is expected to be only slightly weaker (pK_{a} < −40).

In the gas phase, H(CHB_{11}F_{11}) has a computed acidity of 216 kcal/mol, compared to an experimentally determined acidity of 241 kcal/mol (in reasonable agreement with the computed value of 230 kcal/mol) for H(CHB_{11}Cl_{11}). In contrast, HSbF_{6} (a simplified model for the proton donating species in fluoroantimonic acid) has a computed gas phase acidity of 255 kcal/mol, while the previous experimentally determined record holder was (C_{4}F_{9}SO_{2})_{2}NH, a congener of bistriflimide, at 291 kcal/mol. Thus, H(CHB_{11}F_{11}) is likely the most acidic substance so far synthesized in bulk, in terms of its gas phase acidity. In view of its unique reactivity, it is also a strong contender for being the most acidic substance in the condensed phase (see above). Some even more strongly acidic derivatives have been predicted, with gas phase acidities < 200 kcal/mol.

Carborane acids differ from classical superacids in being well-defined one component substances. In contrast, classical superacids are often mixtures of a Brønsted acid and Lewis acid (e.g. HF/SbF_{5}). Despite being the strongest acid, the boron-based carborane acids are described as being "gentle", cleanly protonating weakly basic substances without further side reactions. Whereas conventional superacids decompose fullerenes due to their strongly oxidizing Lewis acidic component, carborane acid has the ability to protonate fullerenes at room temperature to yield an isolable salt. Furthermore, the anion that forms as a result of proton transfer is nearly completely inert. This property is what makes the carborane acids the only substances that are comparable in acidity to the mixed superacids that can also be stored in a glass bottle, as various fluoride-donating species (which attack glass) are not present or generated.

== History ==
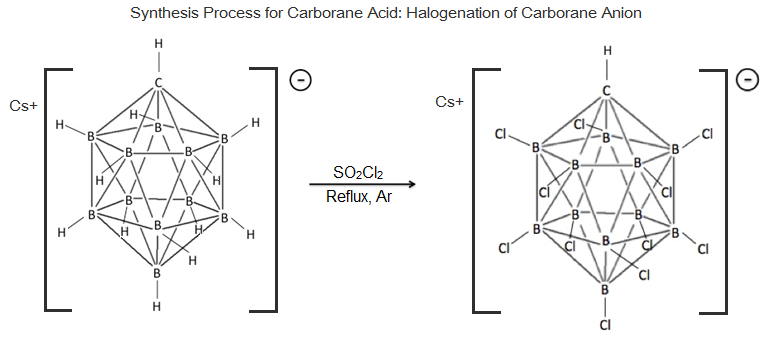
Synthesis of Carborane acid from Cs^{+}[HCB_{11}H_{11}]^{−} to Cs^{+}[HCB_{11}Cl_{11}]^{−}.

Carborane acid was first discovered and synthesized by Professor Christopher Reed and his colleagues in 2004 at the University of California, Riverside. The parent molecule from which carborane acid is derived, an icosahedral carboranate anion, HCB_{11}H^{−}_{11}, was first synthesized at DuPont in 1967 by Walter Knoth. Research into this molecule's properties was put on hiatus until the mid 1980s when the Czech group of boron scientists, Plešek, Štíbr, and Heřmánek improved the process for halogenation of carborane molecules. These findings were instrumental in developing the current procedure for carborane acid synthesis. The process consists of treating Cs^{+}[HCB_{11}H_{11}]^{−} with SO_{2}Cl_{2}, refluxing under dry argon to fully chlorinate the molecule yielding carborane acid, but this has been shown to fully chlorinate only under select conditions.

In 2010, Reed published a guide giving detailed procedures for the synthesis of carborane acids and their derivatives. Nevertheless, the synthesis of carborane acids remains lengthy and difficult and requires a well-maintained glovebox and some specialized equipment. The starting material is commercially available decaborane(14), a highly toxic substance. The most well-studied carborane acid H(CHB_{11}Cl_{11}) is prepared in 13 steps. The last few steps are especially sensitive and require a glovebox at < 1 ppm H_{2}O without any weakly basic solvent vapors, since bases as weak as benzene or dichloromethane will react with carborane-based electrophiles and Brønsted acids. The final step of the synthesis is the metathesis of the μ-hydridodisilylium carboranate salt with excess liquid, anhydrous hydrogen chloride, presumably driven by the formation of strong Si–Cl and H–H bonds in the volatile byproducts:

[Et_{3}Si–H–SiEt_{3}]^{+}[HCB_{11}Cl_{11}]^{−} + 2HCl →H(CHB_{11}Cl_{11}) + 2Et_{3}SiCl + H_{2}

The product was isolated by evaporation of the byproducts and was characterized by its infrared (ν_{CH} = 3023 cm^{−1}) and nuclear magnetic resonance (δ 4.55 (s, 1H, CH), 20.4 (s, 1H, H^{+}) in liquid SO_{2}) spectra (note the extremely downfield chemical shift of the acidic proton). Although the reactions used in the synthesis are analogous, obtaining a pure sample of the more acidic H(CHB_{11}F_{11}) turned out to be even more difficult, requiring extremely rigorous procedures to exclude traces of weakly basic impurities.

== Structure ==
Carborane acid consists of 11 boron atoms; each boron atom is bound to a chlorine atom. The chlorine atoms serve to enhance acidity and act as shields against attacks from the outside due to the steric hindrance they form around the cluster. The cluster, consisting of the 11 borons, 11 chlorines, and a single carbon atom, is paired with a hydrogen atom, bound to the carbon atom. The boron and carbon atoms are allowed to form six bonds due to boron's ability to form three-center, two-electron bonds.

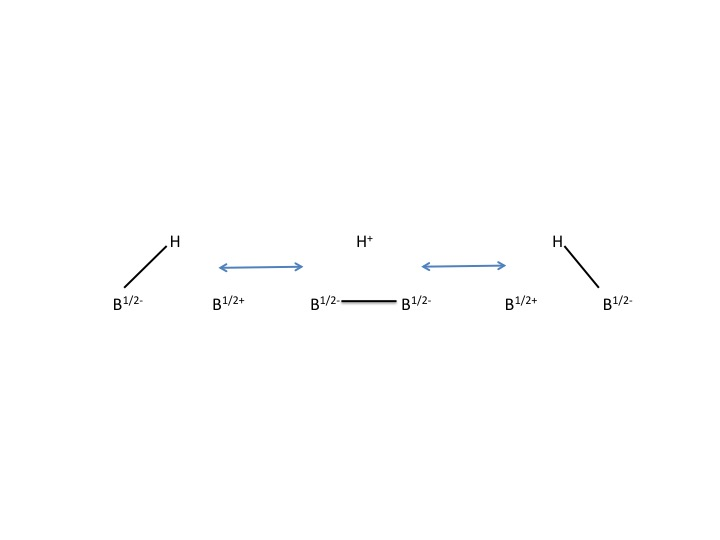
Boron has the ability to form "three-center-two-electron bond." Pictured here are the resonance structures of a 3c-2e bond in diborane.

Although the structure of the carborane acid differs greatly from conventional acids, both distribute charge and stability in a similar fashion. The carboranate anion distributes its charge by delocalizing the electrons throughout the 12 cage atoms. This was shown in a single crystal X-ray diffraction study revealing shortened bond lengths in the heterocyclic portion of the ring suggesting electronic delocalization.

The chlorinated carba-closo-dodecaborate anion HCB_{11}Cl^{−}_{11} is an outstandingly stable anion with what has previously been described as "substitutionally inert" B–Cl vertices.

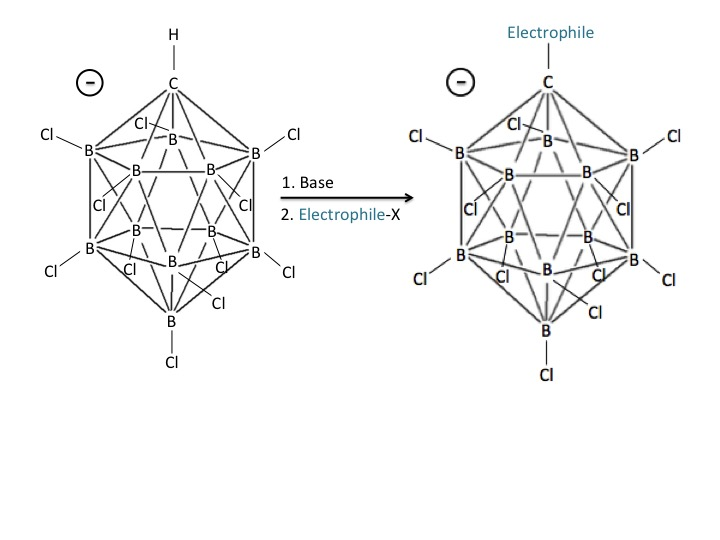
While the C-vertex of the boron-based anion can de deprotonated and furthermore react with electrophiles, the B–Cl vertices remain substantially inert.

The descriptor closo indicates that the molecule is formally derived (by B-to-C^{+} replacement) from a borane of stoichiometry and charge [B_{n}H_{n}]^{2−} (n = 12 for known carborane acids). The cagelike structure formed by the 11 boron atoms and 1 carbon atom allows the electrons to be highly delocalized through the 3D cage (the special stabilization of the carborane system has been termed "σ-aromaticity"), and the high energy required to disrupt the boron cluster portion of the molecule is what gives the anion its remarkable stability. Because the anion is extremely stable, it will not behave as a nucleophile toward the protonated substrate, while the acid itself is completely non-oxidizing, unlike the Lewis acidic components of many superacids like antimony pentafluoride. Hence, sensitive molecules like C_{60} can be protonated without decomposition.

== Usage ==
There are many proposed applications for the boron-based carborane acids. For instance, they have been proposed as catalysts for hydrocarbon cracking and isomerization of n-alkanes to form branched isoalkanes ("isooctane", for example). Carborane acids may also be used as strong, selective Brønsted acids for fine chemical synthesis, where the low nucleophilicity of the counteranion may be advantageous. In mechanistic organic chemistry, they may be used in the study of reactive cationic intermediates. In inorganic synthesis, their unparalleled acidity may allow for the isolation of exotic species like salts of protonated xenon.
