= Hammett acidity function =

Measure of acidity for very strong acids

The Hammett acidity function (H_{0}) is a measure of acidity that is used for very concentrated solutions of strong acids, including superacids. It was proposed by the physical organic chemist Louis Plack Hammett and is the best-known acidity function used to extend the measure of Brønsted–Lowry acidity beyond the dilute aqueous solutions for which the pH scale is useful.

In highly concentrated solutions, simple approximations such as the Henderson–Hasselbalch equation are no longer valid due to the variations of the activity coefficients. The Hammett acidity function is used in fields such as physical organic chemistry for the study of acid-catalyzed reactions, because some of these reactions use acids in very high concentrations, or even neat (pure).

== Definition ==
The Hammett acidity function, H_{0}, can replace the pH in concentrated solutions. It is defined using an equation analogous to the Henderson–Hasselbalch equation:

$$H_{0} = \mbox{p}K_\ce{BH^+}  + \log \frac\ce{[B]}\ce{[BH^+]}$$

where log(x) is the common logarithm of x, and pK_{BH^{+}} is −log(K) for the dissociation of BH^{+}, which is the conjugate acid of a very weak base B, with a very negative pK_{BH^{+}}. In this way, it is rather as if the pH scale has been extended to very negative values. Hammett originally used a series of anilines with electron-withdrawing groups for the bases.

Hammett also pointed out the equivalent form

$$H_{0} = -\log \left ( a_\ce{H^+} \frac{\gamma_\ce{B}}{\gamma_\ce{BH^+}} \right )$$

where a is the activity, and the γ are thermodynamic activity coefficients. In dilute aqueous solution (pH 0–14) the predominant acid species is H_{3}O^{+} and the activity coefficients are close to unity, so H_{0} is approximately equal to the pH. However, beyond this pH range, the effective hydrogen-ion activity changes much more rapidly than the concentration. This is often due to changes in the nature of the acid species; for example in concentrated sulfuric acid, the predominant acid species ("H^{+}") is not H_{3}O^{+} but rather H_{3}SO_{4}^{+}, which is a much stronger acid. The value H_{0} = −12 for pure sulfuric acid must not be interpreted as pH = −12 (which would imply an impossibly high H_{3}O^{+} concentration of 10^{+12} mol/L in ideal solution). Instead it means that the acid species present (H_{3}SO_{4}^{+}) has a protonating ability equivalent to H_{3}O^{+} at a fictitious (ideal) concentration of 10^{12} mol/L, as measured by its ability to protonate weak bases.

Although the Hammett acidity function is the best known acidity function, other acidity functions have been developed by authors such as Arnett, Cox, Katrizky, Yates, and Stevens.

== Typical values ==
On this scale, pure H_{2}SO_{4} (18.4 M) has a H_{0} value of −12, and pyrosulfuric acid has H_{0} ~ −15. Take note that the Hammett acidity function clearly avoids water in its equation. It is a generalization of the pH scale—in a dilute aqueous solution (where B is H_{2}O), pH is very nearly equal to H_{0}. By using a solvent-independent quantitative measure of acidity, the implications of the leveling effect are eliminated, and it becomes possible to directly compare the acidities of different substances (e.g. using pK_{a}, HF is weaker than HCl or H_{2}SO_{4} in water but stronger than HCl in glacial acetic acid.)

List of acids by Hammett acidity
Name	H_{0}	Ref
Trifluoroacetic acid	−2.7	
Phosphoric acid	−4.66	
Nitric acid	−6.3	
Methanesulfonic acid	−7.86	
Sulfuric acid	−11.93	
Perchloric acid	−13	
Triflic acid	−13.7	
Chlorosulfuric acid	−13.79	
Oleum (50 mole% SO_{3})	−14.44	
Fluorosulfuric acid	−15.07	
Hydrofluoric acid	−15.1	
Fluoroboric acid	−16.6	
Carborane acid	≤−18	
Magic acid (1:1 FSO_{3}H-SbF_{5})	−23.0	
Fluoroantimonic acid (1:1 HF-SbF_{5})	−28	

For mixtures (e.g., partly diluted acids in water), the acidity function depends on the composition of the mixture and has to be determined empirically. Graphs of H_{0} vs mole fraction can be found in the literature for many acids.
