= Mineral acid =

Acid derived from inorganic compounds

A mineral acid (or inorganic acid) is an acid derived from one or more inorganic compounds, as opposed to organic acids which are acidic, organic compounds. All mineral acids form hydrogen ions and the conjugate base when dissolved in water.

== Characteristics ==
Commonly used mineral acids are sulfuric acid (H_{2}SO_{4}), hydrochloric acid (HCl) and nitric acid (HNO_{3}); these are also known as bench acids. Mineral acids range from superacids (such as perchloric acid) to very weak ones (such as boric acid). Mineral acids tend to be very soluble in water and insoluble in organic solvents.

Mineral acids are used in many sectors of the chemical industry as feedstocks for the synthesis of other chemicals, both organic and inorganic. Large quantities of these acids—especially sulfuric acid, nitric acid, and hydrochloric acid—are manufactured for commercial use in large plants.

Mineral acids are also used directly for their corrosive properties. For example, a dilute solution of hydrochloric acid is used for removing the deposits from the inside of boilers, with precautions taken to prevent the corrosion of the boiler by the acid. This process is known as descaling.

== Examples ==
- Solutions of a hydrogen halide:
  - Hydrofluoric acid HF
  - Hydrochloric acid HCl
  - Hydrobromic acid HBr
  - Hydroiodic acid HI
- Nitric acid HNO_{3}
- Phosphoric acid H_{3}PO_{4}
- Sulfuric acid H_{2}SO_{4}
- Boric acid H_{3}BO_{3}
- Perchloric acid HClO_{4}
- Hydrocyanic acid HCN
