= Hydrogen fluoride =

Names
- Systematic IUPAC name Fluorane
- Other names Hydrogenfluoride

Identifiers
CAS Number	7664-39-3
3D model (JSmol)	Interactive image
ChEBI	CHEBI:29228
ChemSpider	14214
ECHA InfoCard	100.028.759
KEGG	C16487
PubChem CID	16211014
RTECS number	MW7875000
UNII	RGL5YE86CZ
UN number	1052
CompTox Dashboard (EPA)	DTXSID1049641
- InChI: InChI=1S/FH/h1H Key: KRHYYFGTRYWZRS-UHFFFAOYSA-N; InChI=1/FH/h1H Key: KRHYYFGTRYWZRS-UHFFFAOYAC
- SMILES: F

Properties
Chemical formula	HF
Molar mass	20.006 g·mol^{−1}
Appearance	colourless gas or colourless liquid (below 19.5 °C)
Odor	unpleasant - extremely piercing, but at extremely low concentrations and at the threshold of detection - odor is faintly minty / sweetish
Density	1.15 g/L, gas (25 °C); 0.99 g/mL, liquid (19.5 °C); 1.663 g/mL, solid (−125 °C)
Melting point	−83.6 °C (−118.5 °F; 189.6 K)
Boiling point	19.5 °C (67.1 °F; 292.6 K)
Solubility in water	miscible (liquid)
Vapor pressure	783 mmHg (20 °C)
Acidity (pK_{a})	3.17 (in water), 15 (in DMSO)
Conjugate acid	Fluoronium
Conjugate base	Fluoride
Refractive index (n_{D})	1.00001

Structure
Molecular shape	Linear
Dipole moment	1.86 D

Thermochemistry
Std molar entropy (S^{⦵}_{298})	8.687 J/g K (gas)
Std enthalpy of formation (Δ_{f}H^{⦵}_{298})	−13.66 kJ/g (gas) −14.99 kJ/g (liquid)

Hazards
- Occupational safety and health (OHS/OSH)
Main hazards	Highly toxic, corrosive, irritant
- GHS labelling
Pictograms	(GHS05: Corrosive) (GHS06: Toxic) (GHS07: Exclamation mark) (GHS08: Health hazard)
Signal word	Danger
Hazard statements	H300+H310+H330, H314
Precautionary statements	P260, P262, P264, P270, P271, P280, P284, P301+P310, P301+P330+P331, P302+P350, P303+P361+P353, P304+P340, P305+P351+P338, P310, P320, P321, P330, P361, P363, P403+P233, P405, P501
NFPA 704 (fire diamond)	4 0 1 POI
Flash point	none
- Lethal dose or concentration (LD, LC)
LD_{50} (median dose)	17 mg/kg (rat, oral)
LC_{50} (median concentration)	1276 ppm (rat, 1 hr); 1774 ppm (monkey, 1 hr); 4327 ppm (guinea pig, 15 min)
LC_{Lo} (lowest published)	313 ppm (rabbit, 7 hr)
- NIOSH (US health exposure limits)
PEL (Permissible)	TWA 3 ppm
REL (Recommended)	TWA 3 ppm (2.5 mg/m^{3}) C 6 ppm (5 mg/m^{3}) [15 min]
IDLH (Immediate danger)	30 ppm

Related compounds
Other anions	Hydrogen chloride Hydrogen bromide Hydrogen iodide Hydrogen astatide
Other cations	Sodium fluoride Potassium fluoride Rubidium fluoride Caesium fluoride
Related compounds	Water; Ammonia
- Except where otherwise noted, data are given for materials in their standard state (at 25 °C [77 °F], 100 kPa). verify (what is ?) Infobox references

Hydrogen fluoride is an inorganic compound with chemical formula HF. It is a colorless gas or liquid that dissolves in water to yield hydrofluoric acid and fumes strongly in air (hydrofluoric acid fumes rising being lighter than air). It is the principal industrial source of fluorine, often in the form of hydrofluoric acid, and is an important feedstock in the preparation of many important compounds including pharmaceuticals and polymers such as polytetrafluoroethylene (PTFE). HF is also widely used in the petrochemical industry as a component of superacids. Due to strong and extensive hydrogen bonding, it boils near room temperature, a much higher temperature than other hydrogen halides.

Hydrogen fluoride is an extremely dangerous gas. It readily forms the highly corrosive hydrofluoric acid upon contact with moisture. The gas can also cause blindness by rapid destruction of the corneas.

== History ==
In 1771 Carl Wilhelm Scheele prepared the aqueous solution, hydrofluoric acid, in large quantities, although hydrofluoric acid had been known in the glass industry before then. French chemist Edmond Frémy (1814–1894) is credited with discovering hydrogen fluoride while trying to isolate fluorine.

== Structure and reactions ==
The structure of chains of HF in crystalline hydrogen fluoride

HF is diatomic in the gas phase, consisting of separate molecules. As a liquid, HF forms relatively strong hydrogen bonds, hence its relatively high boiling point. Solid HF consists of zigzag chains of HF molecules. The HF molecules, with a short covalent H–F bond of 95 pm length, are linked to neighboring molecules by intermolecular H–F distances of 155 pm. Liquid HF also consists of chains of HF molecules, but the chains are shorter, consisting on average of only five or six molecules.

=== Comparison with other hydrogen halides ===
Hydrogen fluoride does not boil until 20 °C (68 °F) in contrast to the heavier hydrogen halides, which boil between −85 and −35 °C (−121 and −31 °F). This hydrogen bonding between HF molecules gives rise to high viscosity in the liquid phase and lower than expected pressure in the gas phase.

=== Aqueous solutions ===
HF is miscible with water (dissolves in any proportion). In contrast, the other hydrogen halides exhibit limiting solubilities in water. Hydrogen fluoride forms a monohydrate HF·H_{2}O with melting point −40 °C (−40 °F), which is 44 °C (79 °F) above the melting point of pure HF.

HF and H_{2}O similarities
Boiling points of the hydrogen halides (blue) and hydrogen chalcogenides (red): HF and H_{2}O break trends.	Freezing point of HF/ H_{2}O mixtures: arrows indicate compounds in the solid state.

Aqueous solutions of HF are called hydrofluoric acid. When dilute, hydrofluoric acid behaves like a weak acid, unlike the other hydrohalic acids, due to the formation of hydrogen-bonded ion pairs [H_{3}O^{+}·F^{−}]. However concentrated solutions are strong acids, because bifluoride anions are predominant, instead of ion pairs. In liquid anhydrous HF, self-ionization occurs:

3 HF ⇌ H_{2}F^{+} + HF^{−}_{2}

which forms an extremely acidic liquid (H_{0} = −15.1).

=== Reactions with Lewis acids ===
Like water, HF can act as a weak base, reacting with Lewis acids to give superacids. A Hammett acidity function (H_{0}) of −21 is obtained with antimony pentafluoride (SbF_{5}), forming fluoroantimonic acid.

== Synthesis ==
Hydrogen fluoride is typically produced by the reaction between sulfuric acid and pure grades of the mineral fluorite (calcium fluoride):

CaF_{2} + H_{2}SO_{4} → 2 HF + CaSO_{4}

About 20% of manufactured HF is a byproduct of fertilizer production, which generates hexafluorosilicic acid. This acid can be degraded to release HF thermally and by hydrolysis:

H_{2}SiF_{6} → 2 HF + SiF_{4}
SiF_{4} + 2 H_{2}O → 4 HF + SiO_{2}

High purity deuterium fluoride results from the reduction of AgF_{2} in a D_{2} atmosphere at 120 °C. Crystallized DF from this reaction, analyzed by neutron diffraction has been used to gain a better understanding of the hydrogen bonding in solid HF.

== Use ==
The primary used of hydrofluoric acid as a precursor to organofluorine compounds and a precursor to sodium hexafluoroaluminate (synthetic cryolite) for the production of aluminum metal via electrolysis.

=== Precursor to organofluorine compounds ===
HF reacts with chlorocarbons to give fluorocarbons. An important application of this reaction is the production of tetrafluoroethylene (TFE), precursor to Teflon. Chloroform is fluorinated by HF to produce chlorodifluoromethane (R-22):

CHCl_{3} + 2 HF → CHClF_{2} + 2 HCl

Pyrolysis of chlorodifluoromethane at 550–750 °C yields TFE.

HF is a reactive solvent in the electrochemical fluorination of organic compounds. In this approach, HF is oxidized in the presence of a hydrocarbon and the fluorine replaces C–H bonds with C–F bonds. Perfluorinated carboxylic acids and sulfonic acids are produced in this way.

1,1-Difluoroethane is produced by adding HF to acetylene using mercury as a catalyst.

HC≡CH + 2 HF → CH_{3}CHF_{2}

The intermediate in this process is vinyl fluoride or fluoroethylene, the monomeric precursor to polyvinyl fluoride.

=== Precursor to metal fluorides and fluorine ===
The electrowinning of aluminium relies on the electrolysis of aluminium fluoride in molten cryolite. Several kilograms of HF are consumed per ton of aluminium produced. Other metal fluorides are produced using HF, including uranium tetrafluoride.

HF is the precursor to elemental fluorine, F_{2}, by electrolysis of a solution of HF and potassium bifluoride. The potassium bifluoride is needed because anhydrous HF does not conduct electricity. Several thousand tons of F_{2} are produced annually.

=== Catalyst ===
HF serves as a catalyst in alkylation processes in refineries. It is used in the majority of the installed linear alkyl benzene production facilities in the world. The process involves dehydrogenation of n-paraffins to olefins, and subsequent reaction with benzene using HF as catalyst. For example, in oil refineries "alkylate", a component of high-octane petrol (gasoline), is generated in alkylation units, which combine C_{3} and C_{4} olefins and isobutane.

=== Solvent ===
Hydrogen fluoride is an excellent solvent. Reflecting the ability of HF to participate in hydrogen bonding, even proteins and carbohydrates dissolve in HF and can be recovered from it. In contrast, most non-fluoride inorganic chemicals react with HF rather than dissolving.

== Lasers ==
High power HF lasers have been constructed but their operating wavelength is strongly absorbed by water in the atmosphere. Systems like the short-lived Tactical High Energy Laser instead rely on deuterium fluoride lasers. Such lasers can produce 4.5W average power with 4000 pulses per second. These lasers rely on combustion reactions of H_{2} or D_{2} with dissociated fluorine gas F_{2}, producing excited vibrational and rotational states of HF:

F + H_{2} → HF^{*} + H

The vibrationally excited state of HF laze around 2.7 μm and DF around 3.8 μm.

== Health effects ==
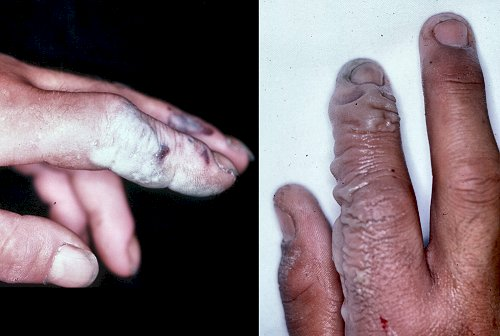
HF burns, not evident until a day after

Hydrogen fluoride is highly corrosive toward tissue. It can cause blindness by rapid destruction of the corneas.
