= Superacid =

Extremely strong acid

In chemistry, a superacid (according to the original definition) is an acid with an acidity greater than that of 100% pure sulfuric acid (H_{2}SO_{4}), which has a Hammett acidity function (H_{0}) of −12. According to the modern definition, a superacid is a medium in which the chemical potential of the proton is higher than in pure sulfuric acid. Commercially available superacids include trifluoromethanesulfonic acid (CF_{3}SO_{3}H), also known as triflic acid, and fluorosulfuric acid (HSO_{3}F), both of which are about a thousand times stronger (i.e. have more negative H_{0} values) than sulfuric acid. Most strong superacids are prepared by the combination of a strong Lewis acid and a strong Brønsted acid. A strong superacid of this kind is fluoroantimonic acid. Another group of superacids, the carborane acid group, contains some of the strongest known acids. Finally, when treated with anhydrous acid, zeolites (microporous aluminosilicate minerals) will contain superacidic sites within their pores. These materials are used on massive scale by the petrochemical industry in the upgrading of hydrocarbons to make fuels.

== History ==
The term superacid was originally coined by James Bryant Conant in 1927 to describe acids that were stronger than conventional mineral acids. This definition was refined by Ronald Gillespie in 1971, as any acid with an H_{0} value lower than that of 100% sulfuric acid (−11.93). George A. Olah prepared the so-called "magic acid", so named for its ability to attack hydrocarbons, by mixing antimony pentafluoride (SbF_{5}) and fluorosulfonic acid (FSO_{3}H). The name was coined after a candle was placed in a sample of magic acid after a Christmas party. The candle dissolved, showing the ability of the acid to protonate alkanes, which under normal acidic conditions do not protonate to any extent.

At 140 °C (284 °F), FSO_{3}H–SbF_{5} protonates methane to give the tertiary-butyl carbocation, a reaction that begins with the protonation of methane:

CH_{4} + H^{+} → CH^{+}_{5}
CH^{+}_{5} → CH^{+}_{3} + H_{2}
CH^{+}_{3} + 3 CH_{4} → (CH_{3})_{3}C^{+} + 3H_{2}

Common uses of superacids include providing an environment to create, maintain, and characterize carbocations. Carbocations are intermediates in numerous useful reactions such as those forming plastics and in the production of high-octane gasoline.

== Origin of extreme acid strength ==
Traditionally, superacids are made from mixing a Brønsted acid with a Lewis acid. The function of the Lewis acid is to bind to and stabilize the anion that is formed upon dissociation of the Brønsted acid, thereby removing a proton acceptor from the solution and strengthening the proton donating ability of the solution. For example, fluoroantimonic acid, nominally (H_{2}FSbF_{6}), can produce solutions with a H_{0} lower than −28, giving it a protonating ability over a billion times greater than 100% sulfuric acid. Fluoroantimonic acid is made by dissolving antimony pentafluoride (SbF_{5}) in anhydrous hydrogen fluoride (HF). In this mixture, HF releases its proton (H^{+}) concomitant with the binding of F^{−} by the antimony pentafluoride. The resulting anion (SbF^{−}_{6}) delocalizes charge effectively and holds onto its electron pairs tightly, making it an extremely poor nucleophile and base. The mixture owes its extraordinary acidity to the weakness of proton acceptors (and electron pair donors) (Brønsted or Lewis bases) in solution. Because of this, the protons in fluoroantimonic acid and other superacids are popularly described as "naked", being readily donated to substances not normally regarded as proton acceptors, like the C–H bonds of hydrocarbons. However, even for superacidic solutions, protons in the condensed phase are far from being unbound. For instance, in fluoroantimonic acid, they are bound to one or more molecules of hydrogen fluoride. Though hydrogen fluoride is normally regarded as an exceptionally weak proton acceptor (though a somewhat better one than the SbF^{−}_{6} anion), dissociation of its protonated form, the fluoronium ion H_{2}F^{+} to HF and the truly naked H^{+} is still a highly endothermic process (ΔG° = +113 kcal/mol), and imagining the proton in the condensed phase as being "naked" or "unbound", like charged particles in a plasma, is highly inaccurate and misleading.

More recently, carborane acids have been prepared as single component superacids that owe their strength to the extraordinary stability of the carboranate anion, a family of anions stabilized by three-dimensional aromaticity, as well as by electron-withdrawing group typically attached thereto.

In superacids, the proton is shuttled rapidly from proton acceptor to proton acceptor by tunneling through a hydrogen bond via the Grotthuss mechanism, just as in other hydrogen-bonded networks, like water or ammonia.

== Applications ==
In petrochemistry, superacidic media are used as catalysts, especially for alkylations. Typical catalysts are sulfated oxides of titanium and zirconium or specially treated alumina or zeolites. The solid acids are used for alkylating benzene with ethene and propene as well as difficult acylations, e.g. of chlorobenzene. In organic chemistry, superacids are used as a means of protonating alkanes to promote the use of carbocations in situ during reactions. The resulting carbocations are of much use in organic synthesis of numerous organic compounds, the high acidity of the superacids helps to stabilize the highly reactive and unstable carbocations for future reactions.

== Examples ==
The following are examples of superacids. Each is listed with its Hammett acidity function, where a smaller value of H_{0} (in these cases, more negative) indicates a stronger acid.

- Helium hydride ion (HeH+, H_{0} = −63)
- Fluoroantimonic acid (H_{2}F:SbF_{6}, H_{0} = −28)
- Magic acid (HSO_{3}F:SbF_{5}, H_{0} = −23)
- Antimony pentafluoride (SbF_{5}, H_{0} = −21)
- Hydrogen fluoride-tantalum pentafluoride (HF:TaF_{5}, H_{0} = −18.85)
- Carborane acids (H(HCB_{11}X_{11}), H_{0} ≤ −18, indirectly determined and depends on substituents)
- Fluoroboric acid (HF:BF_{3}, H_{0} = −16.6)
- Bistriflimidic acid (NH(CF_{3}SO_{2})_{2}, H_{0} = −15.8. Estimated value calculated from pK_{a} values in 1,2-dichloroethane in comparison to triflic acid)
- Hydrogen fluoride (anhydrous) (HF, H_{0} = -15.1)
- Fluorosulfuric acid (FSO_{3}H, H_{0} = −15.1)
- Triflic acid (CF_{3}SO_{3}H, H_{0} = −14.9)
- Oleum (SO_{3}:H_{2}SO_{4}, H_{0} = −14.5)
- Chlorosulfuric acid (HSO_{3}Cl), H_{0} = −13.8)
- Perfluorobutanesulfonic acid (C_{4}F_{9}SO_{3}H, H_{0} = −13.2)
- Perchloric acid (HClO_{4}, H_{0} = −13)
- Nafion (fluoropolymer with sulfonic acid groups, H_{0} between −11 and −13)
- Perfluorohexanesulfonic acid (C_{6}F_{13}SO_{3}H, H_{0} = −12.3)
- Sulfuric acid (H_{2}SO_{4}, H_{0} = −11.9)

== See also ==
- Superbase
- Acid dissociation constant
- Non-coordinating anion
