= Magic acid =

Superacid system prepared from a Brønsted and a Lewis superacid

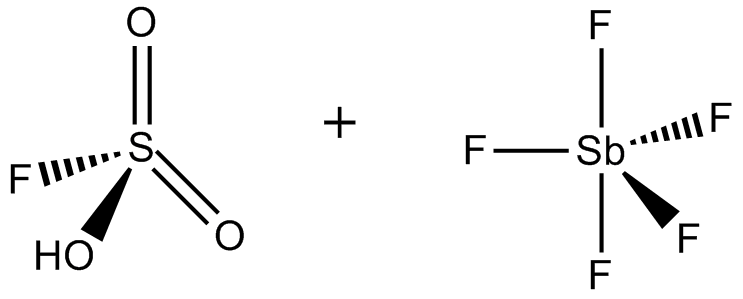
- Fluorosulfuric acid-antimony pentafluoride 1:1

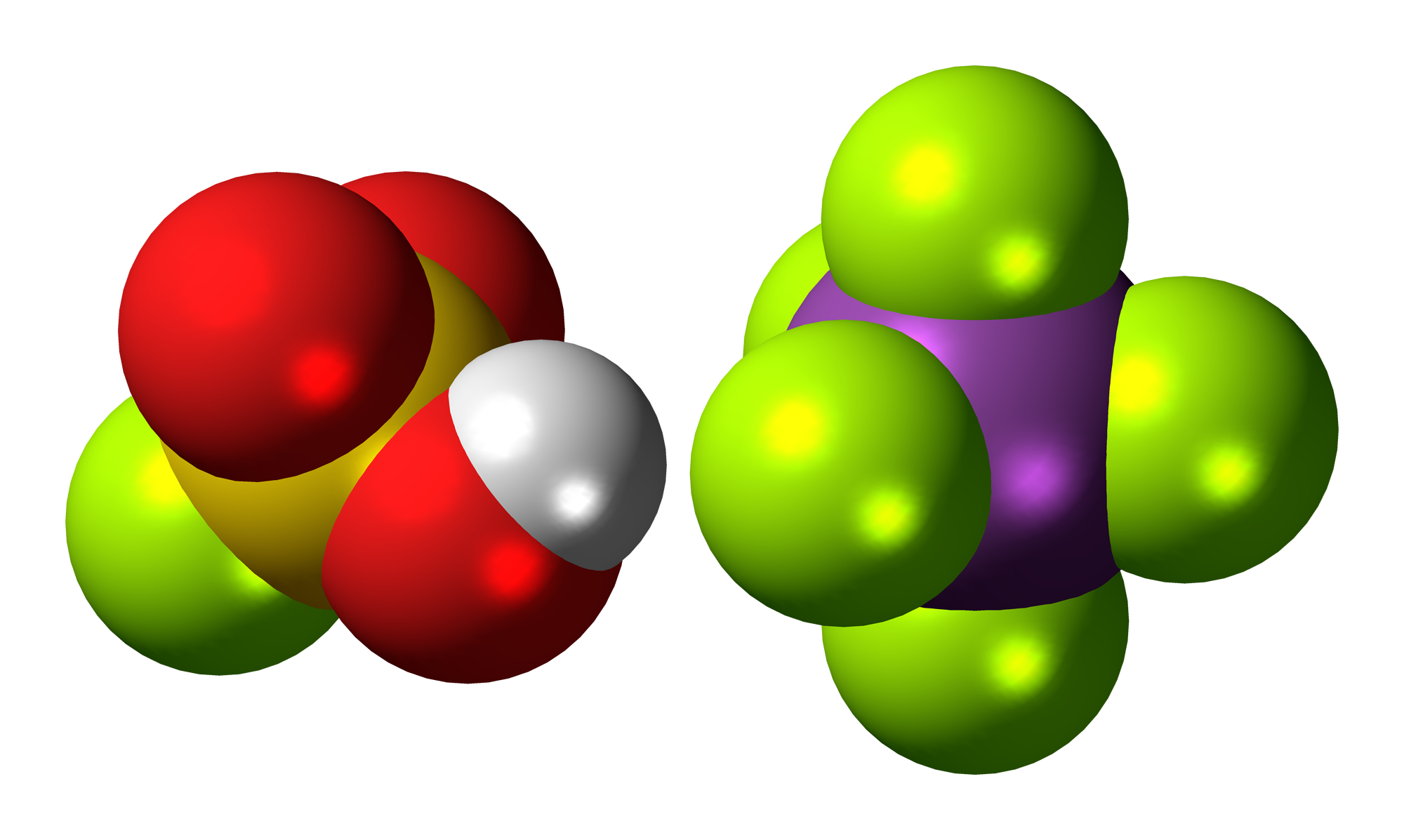

Names
- IUPAC name Sulfurofluoridic acid — pentafluorostiborane (1:1)
- Other names Fluorosulfonyl Pentafluoroantimonic acid

Identifiers
CAS Number	23854-38-8
3D model (JSmol)	Interactive image
ChemSpider	17339394
ECHA InfoCard	100.041.727
PubChem CID	16211378
CompTox Dashboard (EPA)	DTXSID00894108
- InChI: InChI=1S/FHO3S.5FH.Sb/c1-5(2,3)4;;;;;;/h(H,2,3,4);5*1H;/q;;;;;;+5/p-5 Key: QNDPUZFBWUBSNH-UHFFFAOYSA-I; InChI=1/FHO3S.5FH.Sb/c1-5(2,3)4;;;;;;/h(H,2,3,4);5*1H;/q;;;;;;+5/p-5/rF5Sb.FHO3S/c1-6(2,3,4)5;1-5(2,3)4/h;(H,2,3,4) Key: QNDPUZFBWUBSNH-UDIXYDQRAK
- SMILES: OS(=O)(=O)F.F[Sb](F)(F)(F)F

Properties
Chemical formula	HSbF_{6}SO_{3}
Molar mass	316.82 g/mol
Appearance	Liquid

Hazards
- Occupational safety and health (OHS/OSH)
Main hazards	Corrosive, Environmentally hazardous, Irritant, Respiratory irritant, Toxic
- GHS labelling
Pictograms	(GHS05: Corrosive) (GHS06: Toxic) (GHS09: Environmental hazard)
Signal word	Danger
Hazard statements	H302, H312, H314, H331, H335, H411
Precautionary statements	P260, P264, P271, P273, P280, P301+P330+P331, P302+P352, P303+P361+P353, P304+P340, P305+P351+P338, P332+P313
NFPA 704 (fire diamond)	4 0 4 W; OX
- Except where otherwise noted, data are given for materials in their standard state (at 25 °C [77 °F], 100 kPa). verify (what is ?) Infobox references

Magic acid (FSO_{3}H·SbF_{5}) is a superacid consisting of a mixture, most commonly in a 1:1 molar ratio, of fluorosulfuric acid (HSO_{3}F) and antimony pentafluoride (SbF_{5}). This conjugate Brønsted–Lewis superacid system was developed in the 1960s by Ronald Gillespie and his team at McMaster University, and has been used by George Olah to stabilise carbocations and hypercoordinated carbonium ions in liquid media. Magic acid and other superacids are also used to catalyze isomerization of saturated hydrocarbons, and have been shown to protonate even weak bases, including methane, xenon, halogens, and molecular hydrogen.

== History ==
The term "superacid" was first used in 1927 when James Bryant Conant found that perchloric acid could protonate ketones and aldehydes to form salts in nonaqueous solution. The term itself was coined by Gillespie, after Conant combined sulfuric acid with fluorosulfuric acid, and found the solution to be several million times more acidic than sulfuric acid alone. The magic acid system was developed in the 1960s by Gillespie, and was to be used to study stable carbocations. Gillespie also used the acid system to generate electron-deficient inorganic cations. The name originated after a Christmas party in 1966, when a member of the Olah lab placed a paraffin candle into the acid, and found that it dissolved quite rapidly. Examination of the solution with ^{1}H-NMR showed a tert-butyl cation, suggesting that the paraffin chain that forms the wax had been cleaved, then isomerized into the relatively stable tertiary carbocation. The name appeared in a paper published by the Olah lab.

== Properties ==
=== Structure ===
Although a 1:1 molar ratio of HSO_{3}F and SbF_{5} best generates carbonium ions, the effects of the system at other molar ratios have also been documented. When the ratio SbF_{5}:HSO_{3}F is less than 0.2, the following two equilibria, determined by ^{19}F NMR spectroscopy, are the most prominent in solution:

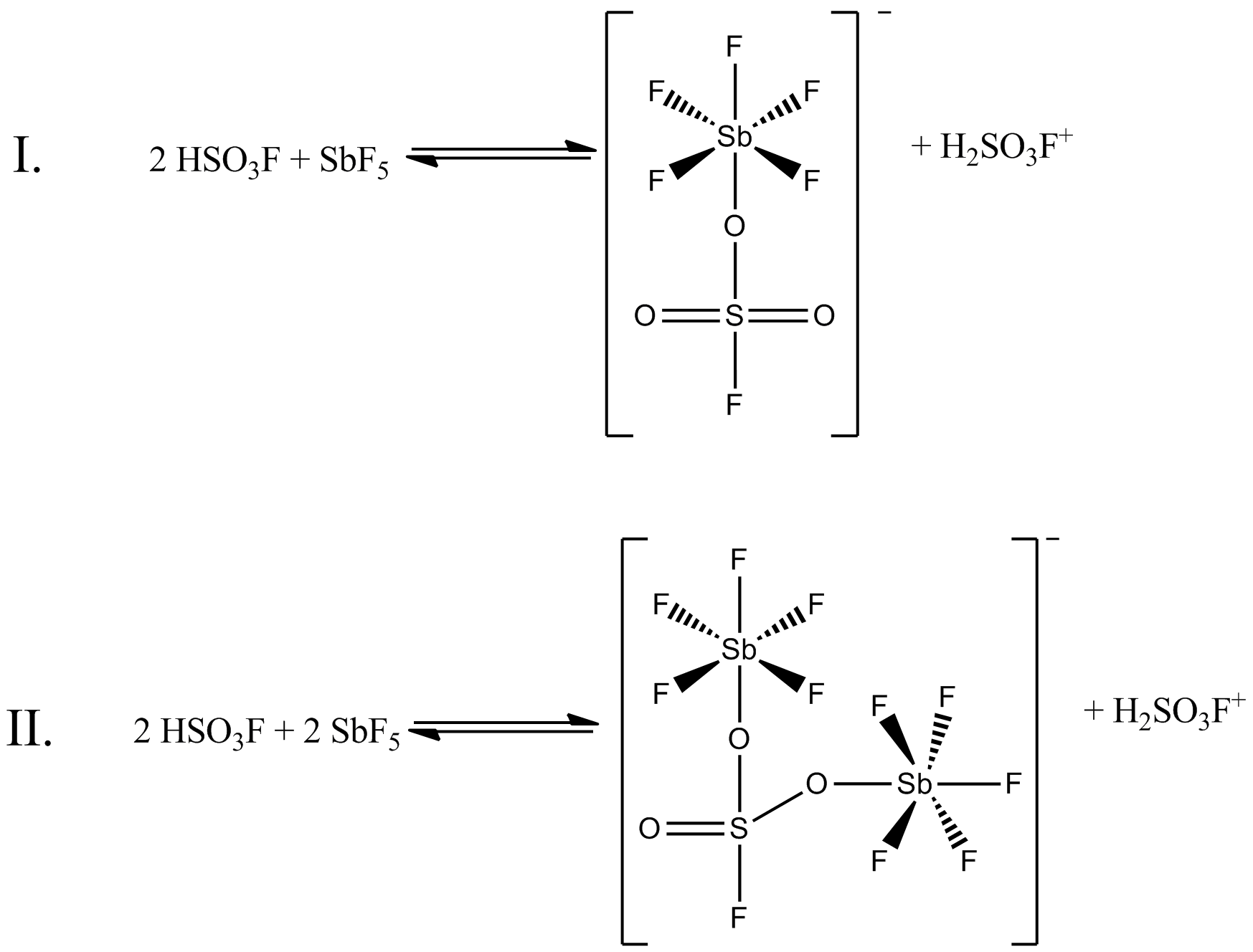

In both of these structures, the sulfur has tetrahedral coordination, not planar. The double bonds between sulfur and oxygen are more properly represented as single bonds, with formal negative charges on the oxygen atoms and a formal plus two charge on the sulfur. The antimony atoms will also have a formal charge of minus one.

In the preceding figure, Equilibrium I accounts for 80% of the NMR data, while Equilibrium II accounts for about 20%. As the ratio of the two compounds increases from 0.4–1.4, new NMR signals appear and increase in intensity with increasing concentrations of SbF_{5}. The resolution of the signals decreases as well, because of the increasing viscosity of the liquid system.

=== Strength ===
All proton-producing acids stronger than 100% sulfuric acid are considered superacids, and are characterized by low values of the Hammett acidity function. For instance, sulfuric acid, H_{2}SO_{4}, has a Hammett acidity function, H_{0}, of −12, perchloric acid, HClO_{4}, has a Hammett acidity function, of −13, and that of the 1:1 magic acid system, HSO_{3}F·SbF_{5}, is −23. Fluoroantimonic acid, the strongest known superacid, is believed to reach extrapolated H_{0} values down to −28.

== Uses ==
=== Observations of stable carbocations ===
Magic acid has low nucleophilicity, allowing for increased stability of carbocations in solution. The "classical" trivalent carbocation can be observed in the acid medium, and has been found to be planar and sp^{2}-hybridized. Because the carbon atom is surrounded by only six valence electrons, it is highly electron deficient and electrophilic. It is easily described by Lewis dot structures because it contains only two-electron, single bonds to adjacent carbon atoms. Many tertiary cycloalkyl cations can also be formed in superacidic solutions. One such example is the 1-methyl-1-cyclopentyl cation, which is formed from both the cyclopentane and cyclohexane precursor. In the case of the cyclohexane, the cyclopentyl cation is formed from isomerization of the secondary carbocation to the tertiary, more stable carbocation. Cyclopropylcarbenium ions, alkenyl cations, and arenium cations have also been observed.

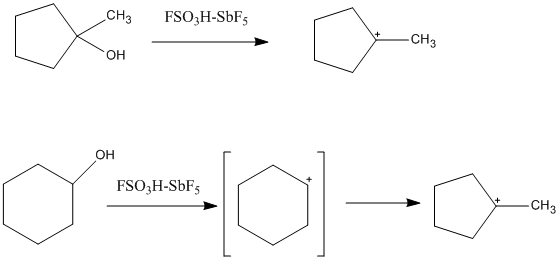

As use of the Magic acid system became more widespread, however, higher-coordinate carbocations were observed. Penta-coordinate carbocations, also described as nonclassical ions, cannot be depicted using only two-electron, two-center bonds, and require, instead, two-electron, three (or more) center bonding. In these ions, two electrons are delocalized over more than two atoms, rendering these bond centers so electron deficient that they enable saturated alkanes to participate in electrophilic reactions. The discovery of hypercoordinated carbocations fueled the nonclassical ion controversy of the 1950s and 60s. Due to the slow timescale of ^{1}H-NMR, the rapidly equilibrating positive charges on hydrogen atoms would likely go undetected. However, IR spectroscopy, Raman spectroscopy, and ^{13}C NMR have been used to investigate bridged carbocation systems. One controversial cation, the norbornyl cation, has been observed in several media, Magic acid among them.

The bridging methylene carbon atom is pentacoordinated, with three two-electron, two-center bonds, and one two-electron, three-center bond with its remaining sp^{3} orbital. Quantum mechanical calculations have also shown that the classical model is not an energy minimum.

=== Reactions with alkanes ===
Magic acid is capable of protonating alkanes. For instance, methane reacts to form the CH^{+}_{5} ion at 140 °C and atmospheric pressure, though some hydrocarbon ions of greater molecular weights are also formed as byproducts. Hydrogen gas is another reaction byproduct.

In the presence of FSO_{3}D rather than FSO_{3}H, methane has been shown to interchange hydrogen atoms for deuterium atoms, and HD is released rather than H_{2}. This is evidence to suggest that in these reactions, methane is indeed a base, and can accept a proton from the acid medium to form CH^{+}_{5}. This ion is then deprotonated, explaining the hydrogen exchange, or loses a hydrogen molecule to form CH^{+}_{3} – the carbonium ion. This species is quite reactive, and can yield several new carbocations, shown below.

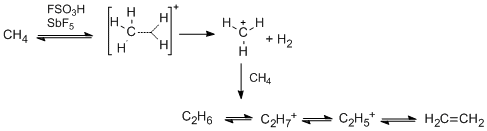

Larger alkanes, such as ethane, are also reactive in magic acid, and both exchange hydrogen atoms and condense to form larger carbocations, such as protonated neopentane. This ion is then cloven at higher temperatures, and reacts to release hydrogen gas and forms the t-amyl cation at lower temperatures.

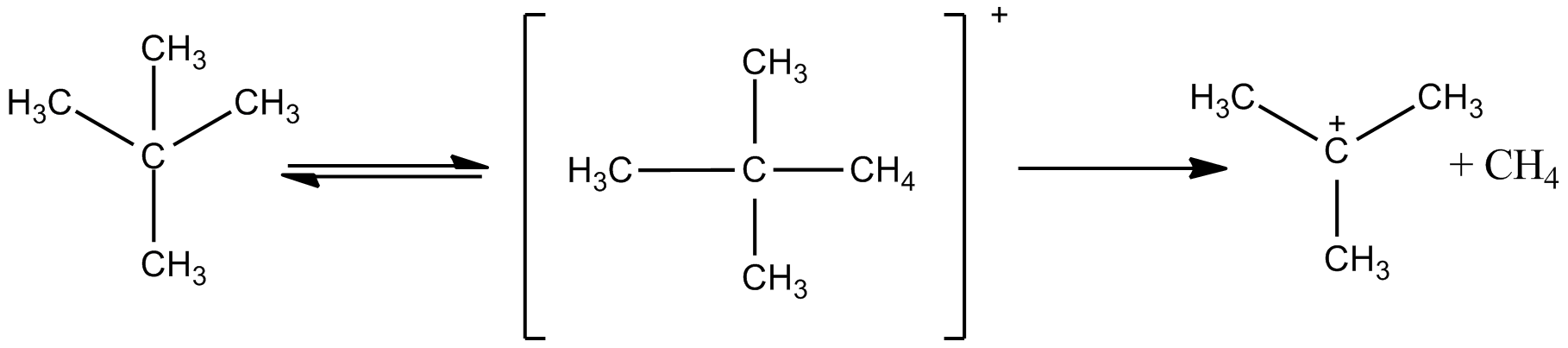

It is on this note that George Olah suggests we no longer take as synonymous the names "alkane" and "paraffin." The word "paraffin" is derived from the Latin "parum affinis", meaning "lacking in affinity." He says, "It is, however, with some nostalgia that we make this recommendation, as ‘inert gases’ at least maintained their ‘nobility’ as their chemical reactivity became apparent, but referring to ‘noble hydrocarbons’ would seem to be inappropriate."

=== Catalysis with hydroperoxides ===
Magic acid catalyzes cleavage-rearrangement reactions of tertiary hydroperoxides and tertiary alcohols. The nature of the experiments used to determine the mechanism, namely the fact that they took place in superacid medium, allowed observation of the carbocation intermediates formed. It was determined that the mechanism depends on the amount of magic acid used. Near molar equivalency, only O–O cleavage is observed, but with increasing excess of magic acid, C–O cleavage competes with O–O cleavage. The excess acid likely deactivates the hydrogen peroxide formed in C–O heterolysis.

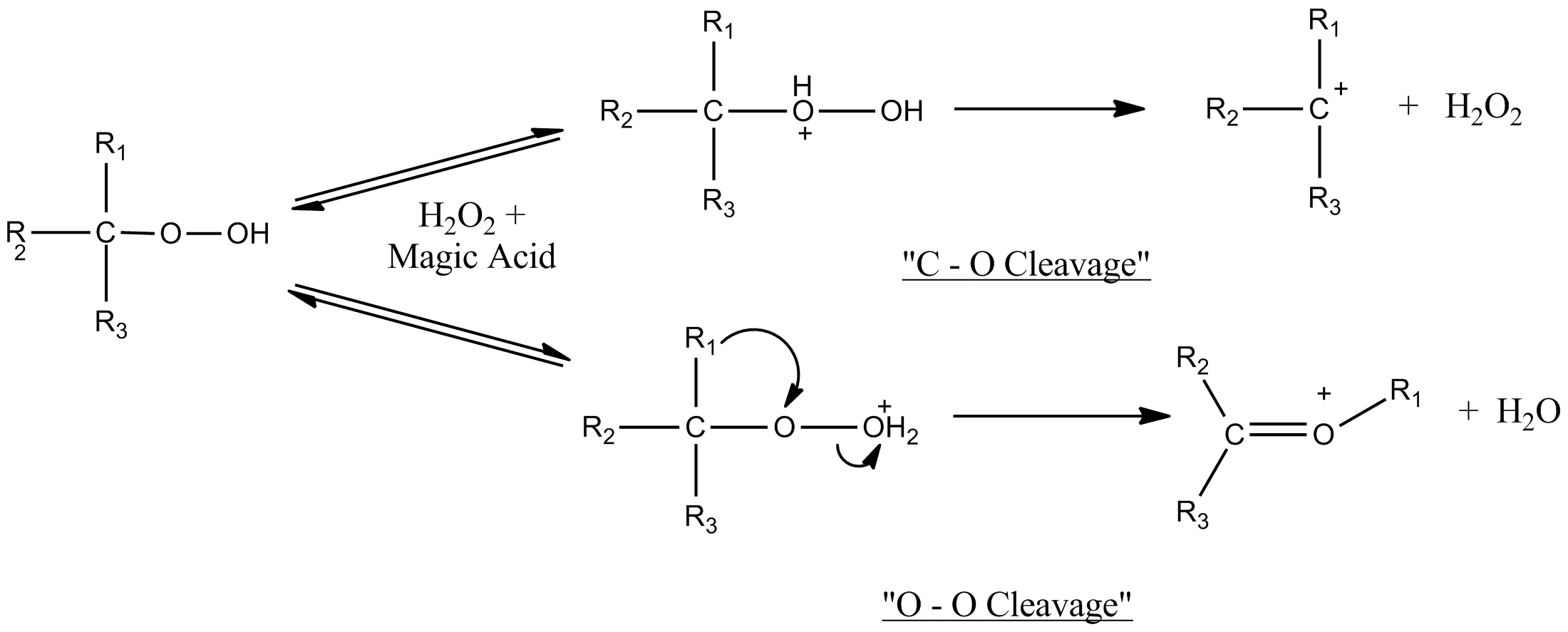

Magic acid also catalyzes electrophilic hydroxylation of aromatic compounds with hydrogen peroxide, resulting in high-yield preparation of monohydroxylated products. Phenols exist as completely protonated species in superacid solutions, and when produced in the reaction, are then deactivated toward further electrophilic attack. Protonated hydrogen peroxide is the active hydroxylating agent.

=== Catalysis with ozone ===
Oxygenation of alkanes can be catalyzed by a magic acid–SO_{2}ClF solution in the presence of ozone. The mechanism is similar to that of protolysis of alkanes, with an electrophilic insertion into the single σ bonds of the alkane. The hydrocarbon–ozone complex transition state has the form of a penta-coordinated ion.

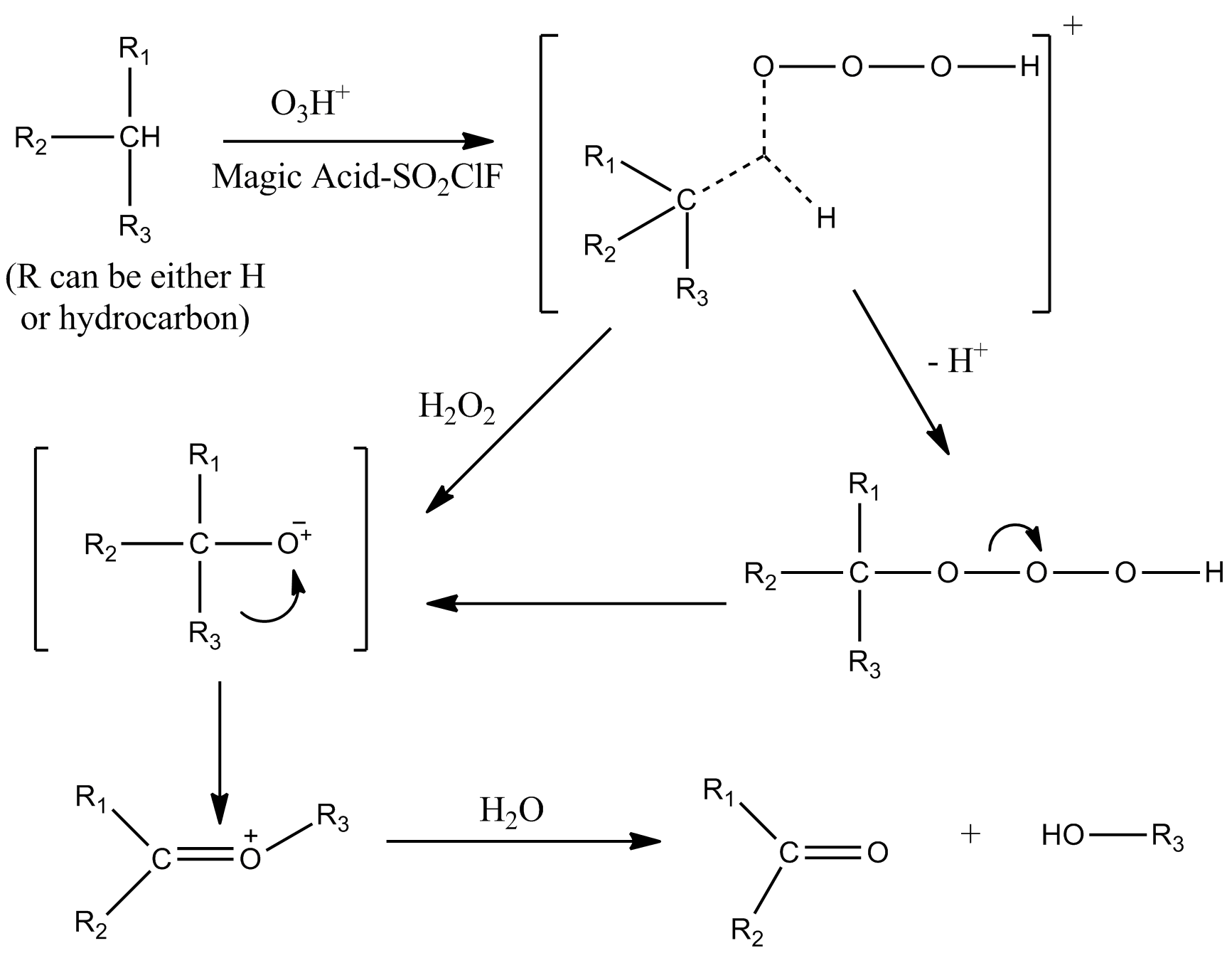

Alcohols, ketones, and aldehydes are oxygenated by electrophilic insertion as well.

== Safety ==
As with all strong acids, and especially superacids, proper personal protective equipment should be used. In addition to the obligatory gloves and goggles, the use of a faceshield and full-face respirator are also recommended. Predictably, magic acid is highly toxic upon ingestion and inhalation, causes severe skin and eye burns, and is toxic to aquatic life.

== See also ==
- Fluoroantimonic acid, the strongest known superacid
