= Fluorosulfuric acid =

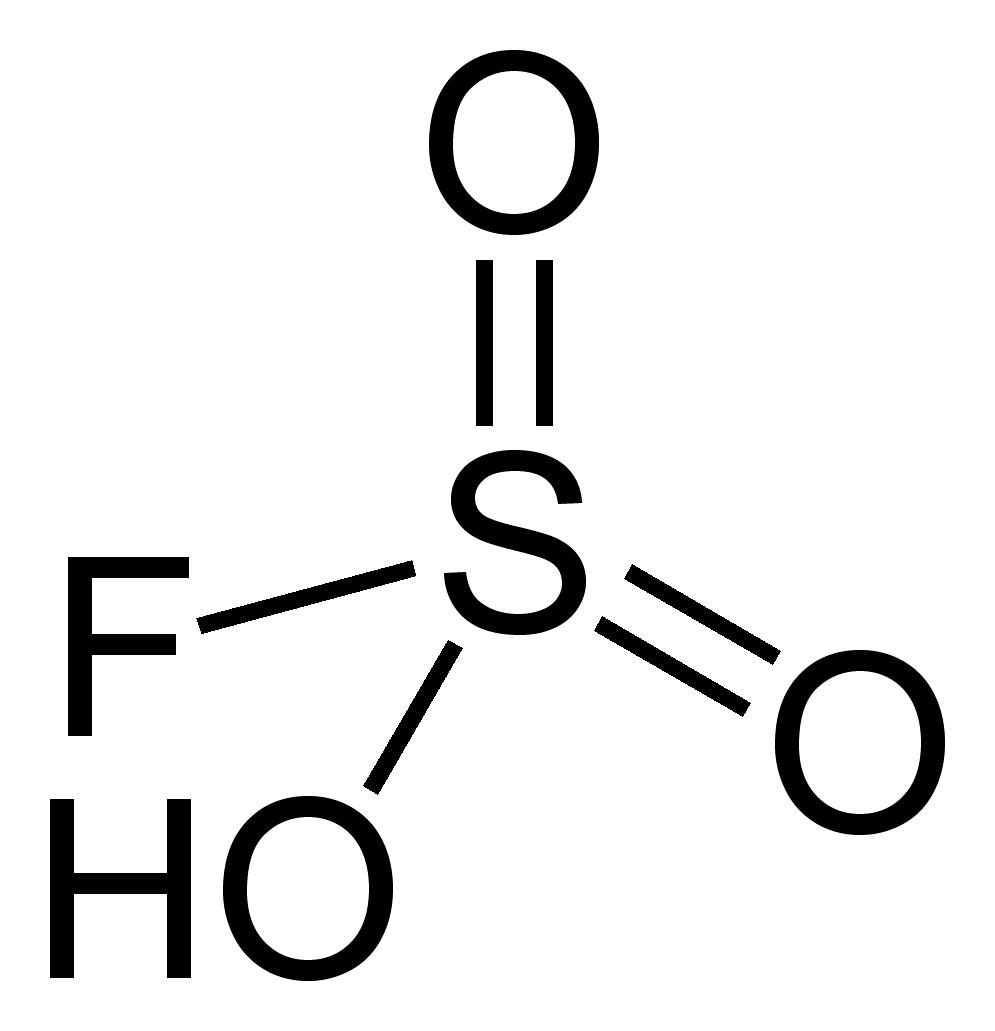
Skeletal formula of fluorosulfuric acid
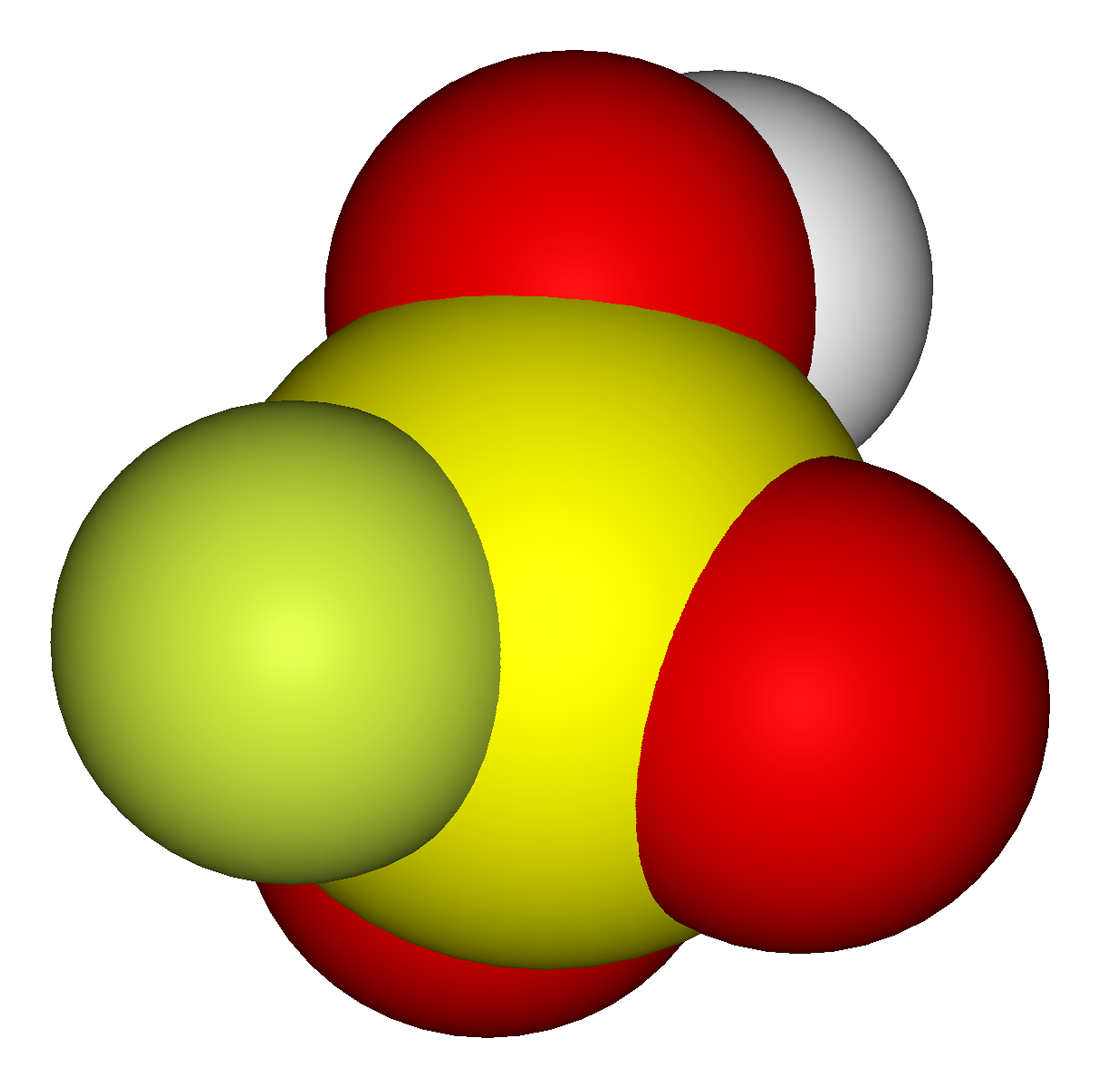
Spacefill model of fluorosulfuric acid
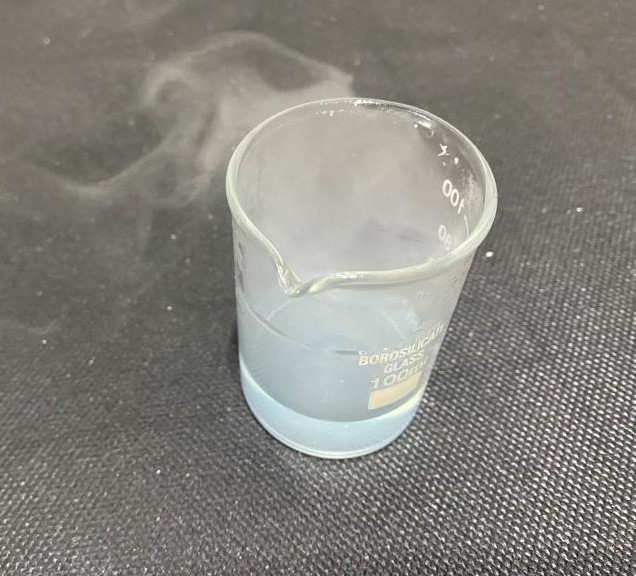

Names
- IUPAC name Sulfurofluoridic acid
- Systematic IUPAC name Fluoridotrioxidosulfuric Acid
- Other names Fluorosulfonic acid, Fluorosulphonic acid, Fluorinesulfonic acid, Fluorinesulphonic acid, Fluoridosulfonic acid, Fluoridosulphonic acid, Sulfuric fluorohydrin, Epoxysulfonyl fluoride

Identifiers
| CAS Number | 7789-21-1 |
| 3D model (JSmol) | Interactive image; Interactive image |
| ChemSpider | 23005 |
| ECHA InfoCard | 100.029.227 |
| EC Number | 232-149-4 |
| MeSH | Fluorosulfonic+acid |
| PubChem CID | 24603 |
| RTECS number | LP0715000 |
| UNII | PPX0648643 |
| UN number | 1777 |
| CompTox Dashboard (EPA) | DTXSID3033511 |
- InChI: InChI=1S/FHO3S/c1-5(2,3)4/h(H,2,3,4) Key: UQSQSQZYBQSBJZ-UHFFFAOYSA-N; InChI=1/FHO3S/c1-5(2,3)4/h(H,2,3,4) Key: UQSQSQZYBQSBJZ-UHFFFAOYAW
- SMILES: OS(F)(=O)=O; FS(=O)(=O)O

Properties
| Chemical formula | FHO_{3}S |
| Molar mass | 100.06 g·mol^{−1} |
| Appearance | Colorless liquid |
| Density | 1.726 g cm^{−3} |
| Melting point | −87.5 °C; −125.4 °F; 185.7 K |
| Boiling point | 165.4 °C; 329.6 °F; 438.5 K |
| Acidity (pK_{a}) | −10 |
| Conjugate base | Fluorosulfate |

Structure
| Coordination geometry | Tetragonal at S |
| Molecular shape | Tetrahedral at S |

Hazards
- GHS labelling
| Pictograms | (GHS07: Exclamation mark) (GHS05: Corrosive) |
| Signal word | Danger |
| Hazard statements | H314, H332 |
| Precautionary statements | P261, P271, P280, P303+P361+P353, P304+P340+P310, P305+P351+P338 |
| NFPA 704 (fire diamond) | 4 0 3 W; OX |
| Safety data sheet (SDS) | ICSC 0996 |

Related compounds
| Related compounds | Antimony pentafluoride Trifluoromethanesulfonic acid Hydrofluoric acid Sulfurous acid Sulfuric acid Chlorosulfuric acid Sulfur hexafluoride |
- Except where otherwise noted, data are given for materials in their standard state (at 25 °C [77 °F], 100 kPa). verify (what is ?) Infobox references

Fluorosulfuric acid (IUPAC name: sulfurofluoridic acid) is the inorganic compound with the chemical formula HSO_{3}F. It is one of the strongest acids commercially available. It is a tetrahedral molecule and is closely related to sulfuric acid, H_{2}SO_{4}, substituting a fluorine atom for one of the hydroxyl groups. It is a colourless liquid, although commercial samples are often yellow due to impurities.

== Properties ==
Fluorosulfuric acid is a free-flowing colorless liquid. It is soluble in polar organic solvents (e.g. nitrobenzene, acetic acid, and ethyl acetate), but poorly soluble in nonpolar solvents such as alkanes.

HSO_{3}F is one of the strongest known simple Brønsted acids. It has an H_{0} value of −15.1 compared to −12 for sulfuric acid. The combination of HSO_{3}F and the Lewis acid antimony pentafluoride produces "Magic acid", which is a far stronger protonating agent. These acids are categorized as "superacids", acids stronger than 100% sulfuric acid.

Reflecting its strong acidity, HSO_{3}F dissolves almost all organic compounds that are even weak proton acceptors. HSO_{3}F hydrolyzes slowly to hydrogen fluoride (HF) and sulfuric acid. The related triflic acid (CF_{3}SO_{3}H) retains the high acidity of HSO_{3}F but is more hydrolytically stable. The self-ionization of fluorosulfonic acid also occurs:

2 HSO_{3}F ⇌ [H_{2}SO_{3}F]^{+} + [SO_{3}F]^{−} K = 4.0 × 10^{−8} (at 298 K)

HSO_{3}F isomerizes alkanes and catalyzes the alkylation of hydrocarbons with alkenes, although it is unclear if such applications are of commercial importance. It can also be used as a laboratory fluorinating agent.

== Production ==
Fluorosulfuric acid is prepared by the reaction of HF and sulfur trioxide:

SO_{3} + HF → HSO_{3}F

Alternatively, KHF_{2} or CaF_{2} can be treated with oleum at 250 °C. Once freed from HF by sweeping with an inert gas, HSO_{3}F can be distilled in a glass apparatus.

== Safety ==
Fluorosulfuric acid is considered to be highly toxic and extremely corrosive. It hydrolyzes to release HF. Addition of water to HSO_{3}F is similar to, and even more violent than, the addition of water to sulfuric acid.

== See also ==
- Chlorine fluorosulfate
- Chlorosulfuric acid
- Sulfuryl fluoride
- Methyl fluorosulfonate, an organic ester of HSO_{3}F
- Trifluoromethylsulfonic acid
