= Proton affinity =

Property of ions and molecules

The proton affinity (PA, E_{pa}) of an anion or of a neutral atom or molecule is the negative of the enthalpy change in the reaction between the chemical species concerned and a proton in the gas phase:

$$\ce{A- +  H+ -> HA}$$
$$\ce{B + H+ -> BH+}$$

These reactions are always exothermic in the gas phase, i.e. energy is released (enthalpy is negative) when the reaction advances in the direction shown above, while the proton affinity is positive. This is the same sign convention used for electron affinity. The property related to the proton affinity is the gas-phase basicity, which is the negative of the Gibbs energy for above reactions, i.e. the gas-phase basicity includes entropic terms in contrast to the proton affinity.

== Acid/base chemistry ==
The higher the proton affinity, the stronger the base and the weaker the conjugate acid in the gas phase. The (reportedly) strongest known base is the ortho-diethynylbenzene dianion (E_{pa} = 1843 kJ/mol), followed by the methanide anion (E_{pa} = 1743 kJ/mol) and the hydride ion (E_{pa} = 1675 kJ/mol), making methane the weakest proton acid in the gas phase, followed by dihydrogen. The weakest known base is the helium atom (E_{pa} = 177.8 kJ/mol), making the hydrohelium(1+) ion the strongest known proton acid.

== Hydration ==
Proton affinities illustrate the role of hydration in aqueous-phase Brønsted acidity. Hydrofluoric acid is a weak acid in aqueous solution (pK_{a} = 3.15) but a very weak acid in the gas phase (E_{pa} (F^{−}) = 1554 kJ/mol): the fluoride ion is as strong a base as SiH_{3}^{−} in the gas phase, but its basicity is reduced in aqueous solution because it is strongly hydrated, and therefore stabilized. The contrast is even more marked for the hydroxide ion (E_{pa} = 1635 kJ/mol), one of the strongest known proton acceptors in the gas phase. Suspensions of potassium hydroxide in dimethyl sulfoxide (which does not solvate the hydroxide ion as strongly as water) are markedly more basic than aqueous solutions, and are capable of deprotonating such weak acids as triphenylmethane (pK_{a} = ca. 30).

To a first approximation, the proton affinity of a base in the gas phase can be seen as offsetting (usually only partially) the extremely favorable hydration energy of the gaseous proton (ΔE = −1530 kJ/mol), as can be seen in the following estimates of aqueous acidity:

Proton affinity	HHe^{+}(g)	→	H^{+}(g)	+ He(g)	+178 kJ/mol	HF(g)	→	H^{+}(g)	+ F^{−}(g)	+1554 kJ/mol	H_{2}(g)	→	H^{+}(g)	+ H^{−}(g)	+1675 kJ/mol
Hydration of acid	HHe^{+}(aq)	→	HHe^{+}(g)		+973 kJ/mol	HF(aq)	→	HF(g)		+23 kJ/mol	H_{2}(aq)	→	H_{2}(g)		−18 kJ/mol
Hydration of proton	H^{+}(g)	→	H^{+}(aq)		−1530 kJ/mol	H^{+}(g)	→	H^{+}(aq)		−1530 kJ/mol	H^{+}(g)	→	H^{+}(aq)		−1530 kJ/mol
Hydration of base	He(g)	→	He(aq)		+19 kJ/mol	F^{−}(g)	→	F^{−}(aq)		−13 kJ/mol	H^{−}(g)	→	H^{−}(aq)		+79 kJ/mol
Dissociation equilibrium	HHe^{+}(aq)	→	H^{+}(aq)	+ He(aq)	−360 kJ/mol	HF(aq)	→	H^{+}(aq)	+ F^{−}(aq)	+34 kJ/mol	H_{2}(aq)	→	H^{+}(aq)	+ H^{−}(aq)	+206 kJ/mol
Estimated pK_{a}	−63					+6					+36

These estimates suffer from the fact the free energy change of dissociation is in effect the small difference of two large numbers. However, hydrofluoric acid is correctly predicted to be a weak acid in aqueous solution and the estimated value for the pK_{a} of dihydrogen is in agreement with the behaviour of saline hydrides (e.g., sodium hydride) when used in organic synthesis.

== Difference from pK_{a} ==
Both proton affinity and pK_{a} are measures of the acidity of a molecule, and so both reflect the thermodynamic gradient between a molecule and the deprotonated form of that molecule. While pKa values often refer to aqueous solutions, pK_{a} can be defined with reference to any solvent, and many weak organic acids have measured pK_{a} values in DMSO. Large discrepancies between pK_{a} values in water versus DMSO (i.e., the pK_{a} of water in water is 14, but water in DMSO is 32) demonstrate that the solvent is an active partner in the proton equilibrium process, and so pK_{a} does not represent an intrinsic property of the molecule in isolation. In contrast, proton affinity is an intrinsic property of the molecule, without explicit reference to the solvent.

A second difference arises in noting that pK_{a} reflects a thermal free energy for the proton transfer process, in which both enthalpic and entropic terms are considered together. Therefore, pK_{a} is influenced both by the stability of the molecular anion, as well as the entropy associated of forming and mixing new species. Proton affinity, on the other hand, is not a measure of free energy.

== List of compound affinities ==
Proton affinities are quoted in kJ/mol, in increasing order of gas-phase basicity of the base.

Proton affinity
Base	Affinity (kJ/mol)
Neutral molecules
Helium	178
Neon	201
Argon	371
Dioxygen	422
Dihydrogen	424
Krypton	425
Hydrogen fluoride	490
Dinitrogen	495
Xenon	496
Nitric oxide	531
Carbon dioxide	548
Methane	552
Hydrogen chloride	564
Hydrogen bromide	569
Nitrous oxide	571
Sulfur trioxide	589
Carbon monoxide	594
Ethane	601
Nitrogen trifluoride	602
Hydrogen iodide	628
Carbonyl sulfide	632
Acetylene	641
Arsenic trifluoride	649
Silane	649
Sulfur dioxide	676
Hydrogen peroxide	678
Ethylene	680
Phosphorus trifluoride	697
Water	697
Carbon disulfide	699
Phosphoryl trifluoride	702
2,4-Dicarba-closo-heptaborane(7)	703
Hydrogen sulfide	712
Hydrogen selenide	717
Hydrogen cyanide	717
Formaldehyde	718
Carbon monosulfide	732
Cyanogen chloride	735
Arsine	750
Benzene	759
Methanol	761
Methanethiol	784
Ethanol	788
Acetonitrile	788
Phosphine	789
Nitrogen trichloride	791
Ethanethiol	798
Propanol	798
Propane-1-thiol	802
Hydroxylamine	803
Dimethyl ether	804
Glyceryl phosphite	812
Borazine	812
Acetone	823
Diethyl ether	838
Dimethyl sulfide	839
Iron pentacarbonyl	845
Ammonia	854
Methylphosphine	854
Hydrazine	856
Diethyl sulfide	858
1,6-Dicarba-closo-hexaborane(6)	866
Aniline	877
P(OCH_{2})_{3}CCH_{3}	877
Ferrocene	877
Dimethyl sulfoxide	884
Dimethyl formamide	884
Trimethyl phosphate	887
Trimethylarsine	893
Methylamine	896
Tri-O-methyl thiophosphate	897
Dimethylphosphine	905
Trimethyl phosphite	923
Dimethylamine	923
Pyridine	924
Trimethylamine	942
Trimethylphosphine	950
Triethylphosphine	969
Triethylamine	972
Lithium hydroxide	1008
Sodium hydroxide	1038
Potassium hydroxide	1100
Caesium hydroxide	1125
Anions
Trioxophosphate(1−)	1301
Iodide	1315
Pentacarbonylmanganate(1−)	1326
Trifluoroacetate	1350
Bromide	1354
Nitrate	1358
Pentacarbonylrhenate(1−)	1389
Chloride	1395
Nitrite	1415
Hydroselenide	1417
Formate	1444
Acetate	1458
Phenoxide	1470
Cyanide	1477
Hydrosulfide	1477
Cyclopentadienide	1490
Ethanethiolate	1495
Nitromethanide	1501
Arsinide	1502
Methanethiolate	1502
Germanide	1509
Trichloromethanide	1515
Formylmethanide	1533
Methylsulfonylmethanide	1534
Anilide	1536
Acetonide	1543
Phosphinide	1550
Silanide	1554
Fluoride	1554
Cyanomethanide	1557
Propoxide	1568
Acetylide	1571
Trifluoromethanide	1572
Ethoxide	1574
Phenylmethanide	1586
Methoxide	1587
Hydroxide	1635
Amide	1672
Hydride	1675
Methanide	1743
Lithium monoxide(1-)	1782
ortho-diethynylbenzene(2-)	1844
