= Base (chemistry) =

Type of chemical substance

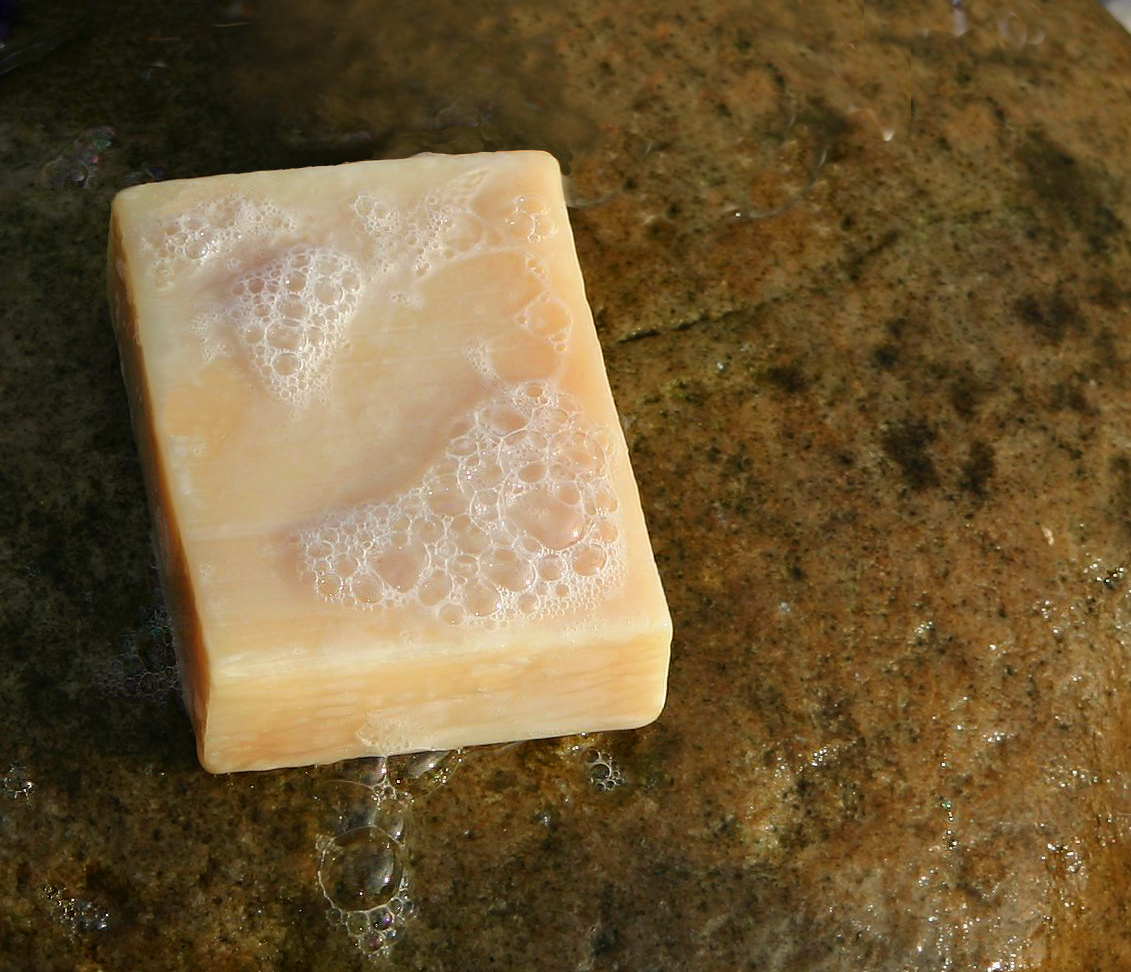
Soaps are weak bases formed by the reaction of fatty acids with sodium hydroxide or potassium hydroxide.

In chemistry, there are three definitions in common use of the word "base": Arrhenius bases, Brønsted bases, and Lewis bases. All definitions agree that bases are substances that react with acids, as originally proposed by G.-F. Rouelle in the mid-18th century.

In 1884, Svante Arrhenius proposed that a base is a substance which dissociates in aqueous solution to form hydroxide ions OH^{−}. These ions can react with hydrogen ions (H^{+} according to Arrhenius) from the dissociation of acids to form water in an acid–base reaction. A base was therefore a metal hydroxide such as NaOH or Ca(OH)_{2}. Such aqueous hydroxide solutions were also described by certain characteristic properties. They are slippery to the touch, can taste bitter, and change the color of pH indicators (e.g., turn red litmus paper blue).

In water, by altering the autoionization equilibrium, bases yield solutions in which the hydrogen ion activity is lower than it is in pure water, i.e., the water has a pH higher than 7.0 at standard conditions. A soluble base is called an alkali if it contains and releases OH^{−} ions quantitatively. Metal oxides, hydroxides, and especially alkoxides are basic, and conjugate bases of weak acids are weak bases.

Bases and acids are seen as chemical opposites because the effect of an acid is to increase the hydronium (H_{3}O^{+}) concentration in water, whereas bases reduce this concentration. A reaction between aqueous solutions of an acid and a base is called neutralization, producing a solution of water and a salt in which the salt separates into its component ions. If the aqueous solution is saturated with a given salt solute, any additional such salt precipitates out of the solution.

In the more general Brønsted–Lowry acid–base theory (1923), a base is a substance that can accept hydrogen cations (H^{+})—otherwise known as protons. This does include aqueous hydroxides since OH^{−} does react with H^{+} to form water, so that Arrhenius bases are a subset of Brønsted bases. However, there are also other Brønsted bases which accept protons, such as aqueous solutions of ammonia (NH_{3}) or its organic derivatives (amines). These bases do not contain a hydroxide ion but nevertheless react with water, resulting in an increase in the concentration of hydroxide ion. Also, some non-aqueous solvents contain Brønsted bases which react with solvated protons. For example, in liquid ammonia, NH_{2}^{−} is the basic ion species which accepts protons from NH_{4}^{+}, the acidic species in this solvent.

G. N. Lewis realized that water, ammonia, and other bases can form a bond with a proton due to the unshared pair of electrons that the bases possess. In the Lewis theory, a base is an electron pair donor which can share a pair of electrons with an electron acceptor which is described as a Lewis acid. The Lewis theory is more general than the Brønsted model because the Lewis acid is not necessarily a proton, but can be another molecule (or ion) with a vacant low-lying orbital which can accept a pair of electrons. One notable example is boron trifluoride (BF_{3}).

Some other definitions of both bases and acids have been proposed in the past, but are not commonly used today.

== Etymology of the term ==
The concept of base stems from an older alchemical notion of "the matrix":

The term "base" appears to have been first used in 1717 by the French chemist, Louis Lémery, as a synonym for the older Paracelsian term "matrix." In keeping with 16th-century animism, Paracelsus had postulated that naturally occurring salts grew within the earth as a result of a universal acid or seminal principle having impregnated an earthy matrix or womb. ... Its modern meaning and general introduction into the chemical vocabulary, however, is usually attributed to the French chemist, Guillaume-François Rouelle. ... In 1754 Rouelle explicitly defined a neutral salt as the product formed by the union of an acid with any substance, be it a water-soluble alkali, a volatile alkali, an absorbent earth, a metal, or an oil, capable of serving as "a base" for the salt "by giving it a concrete or solid form." Most acids known in the 18th century were volatile liquids or "spirits" capable of distillation, whereas salts, by their very nature, were crystalline solids. Hence it was the substance that neutralized the acid which supposedly destroyed the volatility or spirit of the acid and which imparted the property of solidity (i.e., gave a concrete base) to the resulting salt.

— William B. Jensen, The origin of the term "base"

== Properties ==
General properties of bases include:

- Concentrated or strong bases are caustic on organic matter and react violently with acidic substances.
- Aqueous solutions or molten bases dissociate into ions and conduct electricity.
- Reactions with indicators: bases turn red litmus paper blue, phenolphthalein pink, keep bromothymol blue in its natural colour of blue, and turn methyl orange-yellow.
- The pH of a basic solution at standard conditions is greater than seven.
- Bases are bitter.

== Reactions between bases and water ==
The following reaction represents the general reaction between a base (B) and water to produce a conjugate acid (BH^{+}) and a conjugate base (OH^{−}):
$$\ce{{B}_{(aq)} + {H2O}_{(l)} <=> {BH+}_{(aq)} + {OH-}_{(aq)}}$$
The equilibrium constant, K_{b}, for this reaction can be found using the following general equation:

$$K_b = \frac{[BH^+][OH^-]}{[B]}$$

In this equation, the base (B) and the extremely strong base (the conjugate base OH^{−}) compete for the proton. As a result, bases that react with water have relatively small equilibrium constant values. The base is weaker when it has a lower equilibrium constant value.

== Neutralization of acids ==
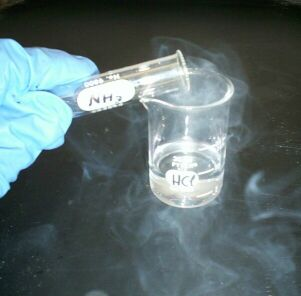
Ammonia fumes from aqueous ammonium hydroxide (in test tube) reacting with hydrochloric acid (in beaker) to produce ammonium chloride (white smoke).

Bases react with acids to neutralize each other at a fast rate both in water and in alcohol. When dissolved in water, the strong base sodium hydroxide ionizes into hydroxide and sodium ions:

$$\ce{NaOH -> Na+ + OH-}$$

and similarly, in water the acid hydrogen chloride forms hydronium and chloride ions:

$$\ce{HCl + H2O -> H3O+ + Cl-}$$

When the two solutions are mixed, the H_{3}O^{+} and OH^{−} ions combine to form water molecules:

$$\ce{H3O+ + OH- -> 2H2O}$$

If equal quantities of NaOH and HCl are dissolved, the base and the acid neutralize exactly, leaving only NaCl, effectively table salt, in solution.

Weak bases, such as baking soda or egg white, should be used to neutralize any acid spills. Neutralizing acid spills with strong bases, such as sodium hydroxide or potassium hydroxide, can cause a violent exothermic reaction, and the base itself can cause just as much damage as the original acid spill.

== Alkalinity of non-hydroxides ==
Bases are generally compounds that can neutralize an amount of acid. Both sodium carbonate and ammonia are bases, although neither of these substances contains OH^{−} groups. Both compounds accept H^{+} when dissolved in protic solvents such as water:

$$\ce{Na2CO3 + H2O -> 2Na+ + HCO3- + OH-}$$
$$\ce{NH3 + H2O -> NH4+ + OH-}$$

From this, a pH, or acidity, can be calculated for aqueous solutions of bases.

A base is also defined as a molecule that has the ability to accept an electron pair bond by entering another atom's valence shell through its possession of one electron pair. There are a limited number of elements that have atoms with the ability to provide a molecule with basic properties. Carbon can act as a base as well as nitrogen and oxygen. Fluorine and sometimes rare gases possess this ability as well. This occurs typically in compounds such as butyl lithium, alkoxides, and metal amides such as sodium amide. Bases of carbon, nitrogen and oxygen without resonance stabilization are usually very strong, or superbases, which cannot exist in a water solution due to the acidity of water. Resonance stabilization, however, enables weaker bases such as carboxylates; for example, sodium acetate is a weak base.

== Strong bases ==
A strong base is a base that is quantitatively protonated upon exposure to water. This complete protonation is a result of the leveling effect. The term "strong base" can lead to confusion, since in this case "strong" is a category of base rather than a qualitative description. For example, guanidine is a very basic molecule, but it does not meet the definition of a strong base because it is not fully protonated by water.

Common examples of strong bases include hydroxides of alkali metals and alkaline earth metals, like sodium hydroxide and calcium hydroxide, respectively. Due to their low solubility, some bases, such as alkaline earth hydroxides, can be used when the solubility factor is not taken into account.

One advantage of this low solubility is that "many antacids were suspensions of metal hydroxides such as aluminium hydroxide and magnesium hydroxide"; compounds with low solubility and the ability to stop an increase in the concentration of the hydroxide ion, preventing the harm of the tissues in the mouth, oesophagus, and stomach. As the reaction continues and the salts dissolve, the stomach acid reacts with the hydroxide produced by the suspensions.

Strong bases hydrolyze in water completely due to the leveling effect. In this process, the water molecule acts as an acid to protonate the base, resulting in the formation of a hydroxide anion. Under anhydrous conditions, some strong bases can even deprotonate weakly acidic C–H bonds. Here is a list of several strong bases:

Lithium hydroxide	LiOH
Sodium hydroxide	NaOH
Potassium hydroxide	KOH
Rubidium hydroxide	RbOH
Caesium hydroxide	CsOH
Magnesium hydroxide	Mg(OH)_{2}
Calcium hydroxide	Ca(OH)_{2}
Strontium hydroxide	Sr(OH)_{2}
Barium hydroxide	Ba(OH)_{2}
Tetramethylammonium hydroxide	N(CH_{3})_{4}OH
Guanidine	HNC(NH_{2})_{2}

The cations of these strong bases appear in the first and second groups of the periodic table (alkali and earth alkali metals). Tetraalkylated ammonium hydroxides are also strong bases since they dissociate completely in water. Guanidine is a special case of a species that is exceptionally stable when protonated, analogously to the reason that makes perchloric acid and sulfuric acid very strong acids.

=== Superbases ===
Group 1 salts of carbanions, amide ions, and hydrides tend to be even stronger bases due to the extreme weakness of their conjugate acids, which are stable hydrocarbons, amines, and dihydrogen. Usually, these bases are created by adding pure alkali metals such as sodium into the conjugate acid or through metal halogen exchange. They are called superbases, and it is impossible to keep them in aqueous solutions because they are stronger bases than the hydroxide ion and would therefore immediately react with water to form hydroxide and their conjugate acid (see the leveling effect). For example, the ethoxide ion (conjugate base of ethanol) undergoes this reaction quantitatively in the presence of water.

$$\ce{CH3CH2O- + H2O -> CH3CH2OH + OH-}$$

Examples of common superbases are:

- Butyl lithium (n-C_{4}H_{9}Li)
- Lithium diisopropylamide (LDA) [(CH_{3})_{2}CH]_{2}NLi
- Lithium diethylamide (LDEA) (C_{2}H_{5})_{2}NLi
- Sodium amide (NaNH_{2})
- Sodium hydride (NaH)
- Lithium bis(trimethylsilyl)amide [(CH_{3})_{3}Si]_{2}NLi

The strongest superbases are synthesised in only gas phase:

- Ortho-diethynylbenzene dianion (C_{6}H_{4}(C_{2})_{2})^{2−} (the strongest superbase ever synthesized)
- Meta-diethynylbenzene dianion (C_{6}H_{4}(C_{2})_{2})^{2−} (second strongest superbase)
- Para-diethynylbenzene dianion (C_{6}H_{4}(C_{2})_{2})^{2−} (third strongest superbase)
- Lithium monoxide anion (LiO^{−}) was considered the strongest superbase before diethynylbenzene dianions were created.

== Weak bases ==
A weak base is one which does not fully ionize in an aqueous solution, or in which protonation is incomplete. For example, ammonia accepts a proton from water according to the equation

NH_{3}(aq) + H_{2}O(l) → NH^{+}_{4}(aq) + OH^{−}(aq)

The equilibrium constant for this reaction at 25 °C is 1.8 × 10^{−5}, such that the extent of reaction or degree of ionization is quite small.

== Lewis bases ==
A Lewis base or electron-pair donor is a molecule with one or more high-energy lone pairs of electrons which can be shared with a low-energy vacant orbital in an acceptor molecule to form an adduct. In addition to H^{+}, possible electron-pair acceptors (Lewis acids) include neutral molecules such as BF_{3} and high oxidation state metal ions such as Ag^{2+}, Fe^{3+} and Mn^{7+}. Adducts involving metal ions are usually described as coordination complexes.

According to the original formulation of Lewis, when a neutral base forms a bond with a neutral acid, a condition of electric stress occurs. The acid and the base share the electron pair that formerly belonged to the base. As a result, a high dipole moment is created, which can only be decreased to zero by rearranging the molecules.

== Solid bases ==
Examples of solid bases include:

- Oxide mixtures: SiO_{2}, Al_{2}O_{3}; MgO, SiO_{2}; CaO, SiO_{2}
- Mounted bases: LiCO_{3} on silica; NR_{3}, NH_{3}, KNH_{2} on alumina; NaOH, KOH mounted on silica on alumina
- Inorganic chemicals: BaO, KNaCO_{3}, BeO, MgO, CaO, KCN
- Anion exchange resins
- Charcoal that has been treated at 900 degrees Celsius or activates with N_{2}O, NH_{3}, ZnCl_{2}-NH_{4}Cl-CO_{2}

Depending on a solid surface's ability to successfully form a conjugate base by absorbing an electrically neutral acid, basic strength of the surface is determined. The "number of basic sites per unit surface area of the solid" is used to express how much basic strength is found on a solid base catalyst. Scientists have developed two methods to measure the amount of basic sites: one, titration with benzoic acid using indicators and gaseous acid adsorption. A solid with enough basic strength will absorb an electrically neutral acidic indicator and cause the acidic indicator's color to change to the color of its conjugate base. When performing the gaseous acid adsorption method, nitric oxide is used. The basic sites are then determined by calculating the amount of carbon dioxide that is absorbed.

== Bases as catalysts ==
Basic substances can be used as insoluble heterogeneous catalysts for chemical reactions. Some examples are metal oxides such as magnesium oxide, calcium oxide, and barium oxide as well as potassium fluoride on alumina and some zeolites. Many transition metals make good catalysts, many of which form basic substances. Basic catalysts are used for hydrogenation, the migration of double bonds, in the Meerwein-Ponndorf-Verley reduction, the Michael reaction, and many others. Both CaO and BaO can be highly active catalysts if they are heated to high temperatures.

== Uses of bases ==
- Sodium hydroxide is used in the manufacture of soap, paper, and the synthetic fiber rayon.
- Calcium hydroxide (slaked lime) is used in the manufacture of bleaching powder.
- Calcium hydroxide is also used to clean the sulfur dioxide, which is caused by the exhaust, that is found in power plants and factories.
- Magnesium hydroxide is used as an 'antacid' to neutralize excess acid in the stomach and cure indigestion.
- Sodium carbonate is used as washing soda and for softening hard water.
- Sodium bicarbonate (or sodium hydrogen carbonate) is used as baking soda in cooking food, for making baking powders, as an antacid to cure indigestion and in soda acid fire extinguisher.
- Ammonium hydroxide is used to remove grease stains from clothes

== Monoprotic and polyprotic bases ==
Bases with only one ionizable hydroxide (OH^{−}) ion per formula unit are called monoprotic since they can accept one proton (H^{+}). Bases with more than one OH- per formula unit are polyprotic.

The number of ionizable hydroxide (OH^{−}) ions present in one formula unit of a base is also called the acidity of the base. On the basis of acidity bases can be classified into three types: monoacidic, diacidic and triacidic.

=== Monoacidic bases ===
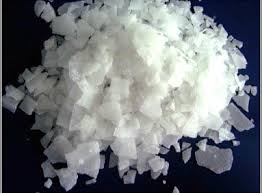
Sodium hydroxide

When one molecule of a base via complete ionization produces one hydroxide ion, the base is said to be a monoacidic or monoprotic base. Examples of monoacidic bases are:

Sodium hydroxide, potassium hydroxide, silver hydroxide, ammonium hydroxide, etc.

=== Diacidic bases ===
When one molecule of base via complete ionization produces two hydroxide ions, the base is said to be diacidic or diprotic. Examples of diacidic bases are:

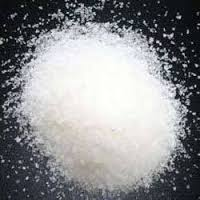
Barium hydroxide

Barium hydroxide, magnesium hydroxide, calcium hydroxide, zinc hydroxide, iron(II) hydroxide, tin(II) hydroxide, lead(II) hydroxide, copper(II) hydroxide, etc.

=== Triacidic bases ===
When one molecule of base via complete ionization produces three hydroxide ions, the base is said to be triacidic or triprotic. Examples of triacidic bases are:

Aluminium hydroxide, ferric hydroxide, gold(III) hydroxide.

== See also ==
- Base-richness (used in ecology, referring to environments)
- Titration
