= Acid dissociation constant =

Measure of an acid's strength in solution

In chemistry, an acid dissociation constant (also known as acidity constant, or acid-ionization constant; denoted $K_a$) is a quantitative measure of the strength of an acid in solution. It is the equilibrium constant for a chemical reaction

$$\ce{HA <=> A^- + H^+}$$

known as dissociation in the context of acid–base reactions. The chemical species HA is an acid that dissociates into A^{−}, called the conjugate base of the acid, and a hydrogen ion, H^{+}. (Note: The hydrogen ion does not exist as such in solution. It combines with a solvent molecule; when the solvent is water a hydronium ion is formed: H^{+} + H_{2}O → H_{3}O^{+}. This reaction is quantitative and hence can be ignored in the context of chemical equilibrium.) The system is said to be in equilibrium when the concentrations of its components do not change over time, because both forward and backward reactions are occurring at the same rate.

The dissociation constant is defined by (Note: It is common practice to quote pK values rather than K values. pK = −log_{10} K. pK_{a} is often referred to as an acid dissociation constant, but this is, strictly speaking, incorrect as pK_{a} is the cologarithm of the dissociation constant.)

$K_\text{a} = \mathrm{\frac{[A^-] [H^+]}{[HA]}},$ or by its logarithmic form
$$\mathrm{p}K_\ce{a} = - \log_{10} K_\text{a} = -\log_{10}\frac{[\ce{A^-}][\ce{H+}]}{\ce{[HA]}} =\log_{10}\frac{\ce{[HA]}}{[\ce{A^-}][\ce{H+}]}$$

where quantities in square brackets represent the molar concentrations of the species at equilibrium. (Note: It is implicit in this definition that the quotient of activity coefficients, $\frac{\gamma_{AH}}{\gamma_{A^-} \gamma_{H^+}},$ is a constant with a value of 1 under a given set of experimental conditions.) For example, a hypothetical weak acid having K_{a} = 10^{−5}, the value of log K_{a} is the exponent (−5), giving pK_{a} = 5. For acetic acid, K_{a} = 1.8 × 10^{−5}, so pK_{a} is 4.7. A lower K_{a} corresponds to a weaker acid (an acid that is less dissociated at equilibrium). The form pK_{a} is often used because it provides a convenient logarithmic scale, and a lower pK_{a} corresponds to a stronger acid.

== Theoretical background ==
The acid dissociation constant for an acid is a direct consequence of the underlying thermodynamics of the dissociation reaction; the pK_{a} value is directly proportional to the standard Gibbs free energy change for the reaction. The value of the pK_{a} changes with temperature and can be understood qualitatively based on Le Chatelier's principle: when the reaction is endothermic, K_{a} increases and pK_{a} decreases with increasing temperature; the opposite is true for exothermic reactions.

The value of pK_{a} also depends on molecular structure of the acid in many ways. For example, Linus Pauling proposed two rules: one for successive pK_{a} of polyprotic acids (see Polyprotic acids below), and one to estimate the pK_{a} of oxyacids based on the number of =O and −OH groups (see Factors that affect pK_{a} values below). Other structural factors that influence the magnitude of the acid dissociation constant include inductive effects, mesomeric effects, and hydrogen bonding. Hammett type equations have frequently been applied to the estimation of pK_{a}.

The quantitative behaviour of acids and bases in solution can be understood only if their pK_{a} values are known. In particular, the pH of a solution can be predicted when the analytical concentration and pK_{a} values of all acids and bases are known; conversely, it is possible to calculate the equilibrium concentration of the acids and bases in solution when the pH is known. These calculations find application in many different areas of chemistry, biology, medicine, and geology. For example, many compounds used for medication are weak acids or bases, and a knowledge of the pK_{a} values, together with the octanol-water partition coefficient, can be used for estimating the extent to which the compound enters the blood stream. Acid dissociation constants are also essential in aquatic chemistry and chemical oceanography, where the acidity of water plays a fundamental role. In living organisms, acid–base homeostasis and enzyme kinetics are dependent on the pK_{a} values of the many acids and bases present in the cell and in the body. In chemistry, a knowledge of pK_{a} values is necessary for the preparation of buffer solutions and is also a prerequisite for a quantitative understanding of the interaction between acids or bases and metal ions to form complexes. Experimentally, pK_{a} values can be determined by potentiometric (pH) titration, but for values of pK_{a} less than about 2 or more than about 11, spectrophotometric or NMR measurements may be required due to practical difficulties with pH measurements.

== Definitions ==
According to Arrhenius's original molecular definition, an acid is a substance that dissociates in aqueous solution, releasing the hydrogen ion H^{+} (a proton):

$$\ce{HA <=> A- + H+}$$

The equilibrium constant for this dissociation reaction is known as a dissociation constant. The liberated proton combines with a water molecule to give a hydronium (or oxonium) ion H_{3}O^{+} (naked protons do not exist in solution), and so Arrhenius later proposed that the dissociation should be written as an acid–base reaction:

$$\ce{HA + H2O <=> A- + H3O+}$$

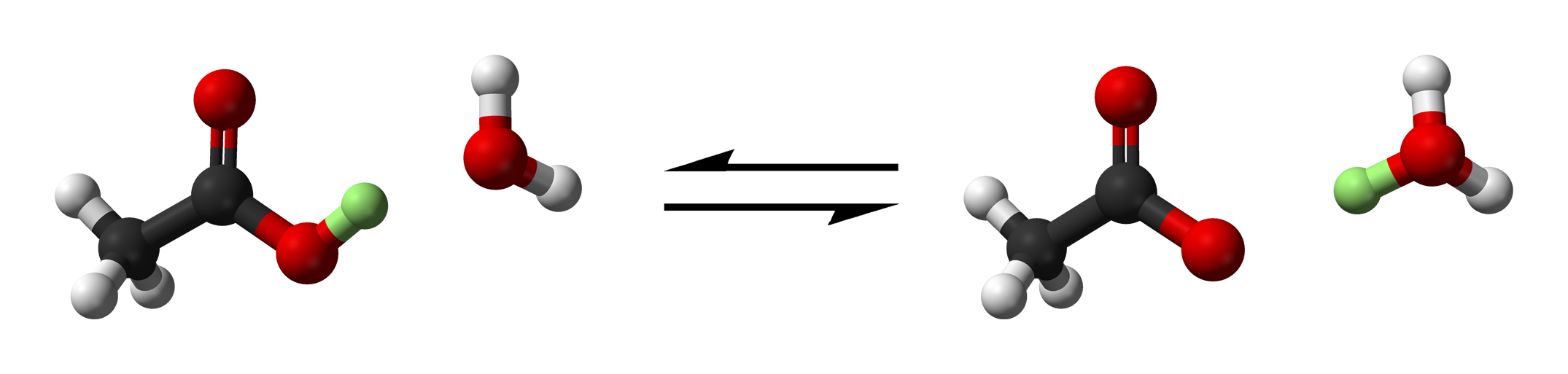
Acetic acid, a weak acid, donates a proton (hydrogen ion, highlighted in green) to water in an equilibrium reaction to give the acetate ion and the hydronium ion. Red: oxygen, black: carbon, white: hydrogen.

Brønsted and Lowry generalised this further to a proton exchange reaction:

$$\text{acid} + \text{base } \ce{<=>} \text{ conjugate base} + \text{conjugate acid}$$

The acid loses a proton, leaving a conjugate base; the proton is transferred to the base, creating a conjugate acid. For aqueous solutions of an acid HA, the base is water; the conjugate base is A^{−} and the conjugate acid is the hydronium ion. The Brønsted–Lowry definition applies to other solvents, such as dimethyl sulfoxide: the solvent S acts as a base, accepting a proton and forming the conjugate acid SH^{+}.

$$\ce{HA + S <=> A- + SH+}$$

In solution chemistry, it is common to use H^{+} as an abbreviation for the solvated hydrogen ion, regardless of the solvent. In aqueous solution H^{+} denotes a solvated hydronium ion rather than a proton.

The designation of an acid or base as "conjugate" depends on the context. The conjugate acid BH^{+} of a base B dissociates according to

$$\ce{BH+ + OH- <=> B + H2O}$$

which is the reverse of the equilibrium

$$\ce{H2O}\text{ (acid)} + \ce{B}\text{ (base) } \ce{<=> OH-}\text{ (conjugate base)} + \ce{BH+}\text{ (conjugate acid)}$$

The hydroxide ion OH^{−}, a well known base, is here acting as the conjugate base of the acid water. Acids and bases are thus regarded simply as donors and acceptors of protons respectively.

A broader definition of acid dissociation includes hydrolysis, in which protons are produced by the splitting of water molecules. For example, boric acid (B(OH)_{3}) produces H_{3}O^{+} as if it were a proton donor, but it has been confirmed by Raman spectroscopy that this is due to the hydrolysis equilibrium:

$$\ce{B(OH)3 + 2 H2O <=> B(OH)4- + H3O+}$$

Similarly, metal ion hydrolysis causes ions such as [Al(H_{2}O)_{6}]^{3+} to behave as weak acids:

$$\ce{[Al(H2O)6]^3+ + H2O <=> [Al(H2O)5(OH)]^2+ + H3O+}$$

According to Lewis's original definition, an acid is a substance that accepts an electron pair to form a coordinate covalent bond.

== Equilibrium constant ==
An acid dissociation constant is a particular example of an equilibrium constant. The dissociation of a monoprotic acid, HA, in dilute solution can be written as

$$\ce{HA <=> A- + H+}$$

The thermodynamic equilibrium constant $K^\ominus$ can be defined by

$$K^\ominus = \frac{\{\ce{A^-}\} \{\ce{H+}\}}{\ce{\{HA\} }}$$

where $\{X\}$ represents the activity, at equilibrium, of the chemical species X. $K^\ominus$ is dimensionless since activity is dimensionless. Activities of the products of dissociation are placed in the numerator, activities of the reactants are placed in the denominator. See activity coefficient for a derivation of this expression.

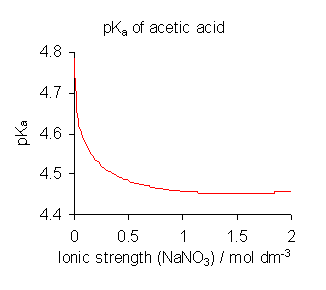
Variation of pK_{a} of acetic acid with ionic strength.

Since activity is the product of concentration and activity coefficient (γ) the definition could also be written as

$$K^\ominus = {\frac{[\ce{A^-}] [\ce{H+}]}\ce{[HA] }\Gamma}, \quad \Gamma=\frac{\gamma_\ce{A^-} \ \gamma_\ce{H+}}{\gamma_\ce{HA} \ }$$

where $[\text{HA}]$ represents the concentration of HA and $\Gamma$ is a quotient of activity coefficients.

To avoid the complications involved in using activities, dissociation constants are determined, where possible, in a medium of high ionic strength, that is, under conditions in which $\Gamma$ can be assumed to be always constant. For example, the medium might be a solution of 0.1 molar (M) sodium nitrate or 3 M potassium perchlorate. With this assumption,

$$K_\text{a} = \frac{K^\ominus}{\Gamma} = \mathrm{\frac{[A^-] [H^+]}{[HA]}}$$
$$\mathrm{p}K_\ce{a} = -\log_{10}\frac{[\ce{A^-}][\ce{H^+}]}{[\ce{HA}]} = \log_{10}\frac{\ce{[HA]}}{[\ce{A^-}][\ce{H+}]}$$

is obtained. Note, however, that all published dissociation constant values refer to the specific ionic medium used in their determination and that different values are obtained with different conditions, as shown for acetic acid in the illustration above. When published constants refer to an ionic strength other than the one required for a particular application, they may be adjusted by means of specific ion theory (SIT) and other theories.

=== Cumulative and stepwise constants ===
A cumulative equilibrium constant, denoted by $\mathrm \beta ,$ is related to the product of stepwise constants, denoted by $\mathrm K .$ For a dibasic acid the relationship between stepwise and overall constants is as follows

$$\ce{H2A <=> A^2- + 2H+}$$
$$\beta_2 = \frac{\ce{[H2A]}}{[\ce{A^2-}][\ce{H+}]^2}$$
$$\log \beta_2 = \mathrm{p}K_\ce{a1} + \mathrm{p}K_\ce{a2}$$

Note that in the context of metal-ligand complex formation, the equilibrium constants for the formation of metal complexes are usually defined as association constants. In that case, the equilibrium constants for ligand protonation are also defined as association constants. The numbering of association constants is the reverse of the numbering of dissociation constants; in this example $\log \beta_1 = \mathrm{p}K_\ce{a2}$

=== Association and dissociation constants ===
When discussing the properties of acids it is usual to specify equilibrium constants as acid dissociation constants, denoted by K_{a}, with numerical values given the symbol pK_{a}.

$$K_\text{dissoc} = \frac{ \ce{[A- ][H+]}}{\ce{[HA]}}: \mathrm{p}K_\text{a} = -\log K_\text{dissoc}$$

On the other hand, association constants are used for bases.

$$K_\text{assoc} = \frac{\ce{[HA]}}{\ce{[A- ][H+]}}$$

However, general purpose computer programs that are used to derive equilibrium constant values from experimental data use association constants for both acids and bases. Because stability constants for a metal-ligand complex are always specified as association constants, ligand protonation must also be specified as an association reaction. The definitions show that the value of an acid dissociation constant is the reciprocal of the value of the corresponding association constant:

$$K_\text{dissoc} = \frac{1}{K_\text{assoc}}$$
$$\log K_\text{dissoc} = - \log K_\text{assoc}$$
$$\mathrm{p}K_\text{dissoc} = - \mathrm{p}K_\text{assoc}$$

Notes

1. For a given acid or base in water, pK_{a} + pK_{b} = pK_{w}, the self-ionization constant of water.
2. The association constant for the formation of a supramolecular complex may be denoted as K_{a}; in such cases "a" stands for "association", not "acid".
3. For polyprotic acids, the numbering of stepwise association constants is the reverse of the numbering of the dissociation constants. For example, for phosphoric acid (details in the polyprotic acids section below):

$$\begin{align}
\log K_{\text{assoc},1} &= \mathrm{p}K_{\text{dissoc},3} \\
\log K_{\text{assoc},2} &= \mathrm{p}K_{\text{dissoc},2} \\
\log K_{\text{assoc},3} &= \mathrm{p}K_{\text{dissoc},1}
\end{align}$$

=== Temperature dependence ===
All equilibrium constants vary with temperature according to the van 't Hoff equation

$$\frac{\mathrm{d} \ln\left(K\right)}{\mathrm{d}T} = \frac{\Delta H^\ominus}{RT^2}$$

$R$ is the gas constant and $T$ is the absolute temperature. Thus, for exothermic reactions, the standard enthalpy change, $\Delta H^\ominus$, is negative and K decreases with temperature. For endothermic reactions, $\Delta H^\ominus$ is positive and K increases with temperature.

The standard enthalpy change for a reaction is itself a function of temperature, according to Kirchhoff's law of thermochemistry:

$$\left(\frac{\partial\Delta H}{\partial T}\right)_p = \Delta C_p$$

where $\Delta C_p$ is the heat capacity change at constant pressure. In practice $\Delta H^\ominus$ may be taken to be constant over a small temperature range.

=== Dimensionality ===
In the equation

$$K_\mathrm{a} = \mathrm{\frac{[A^-] [H^+]}{[HA]}},$$

K_{a} appears to have dimensions of concentration. However, since $\Delta G = -RT\ln K$, the equilibrium constant, $K$, cannot have a physical dimension. This apparent paradox can be resolved in various ways.

1. Assume that the quotient of activity coefficients has a numerical value of 1, so that $K$ has the same numerical value as the thermodynamic equilibrium constant $K^\ominus$.
2. Express each concentration value as the ratio c/c^{0}, where c^{0} is the concentration in a [hypothetical] standard state, with a numerical value of 1, by definition.
3. Express the concentrations on the mole fraction scale. Since mole fraction has no dimension, the quotient of concentrations will, by definition, be a pure number.

The first and second options above give identical numerical values for an equilibrium constant. Furthermore, since a concentration $c_i$ is simply proportional to mole fraction $x_i$ and density $\rho$:
$$c_i = \frac{x_i\rho}{M}$$
and since the molar mass $M$ is a constant in dilute solutions, an equilibrium constant value determined using the third option will simply be proportional to the values obtained with the first two.

It is common practice in biochemistry to quote a value with a dimension as, for example, "K_{a} = 30 mM" in order to indicate the scale, millimolar (mM) or micromolar (μM) of the concentration values used for its calculation.

== Strong acids and bases ==
An acid is classified as "strong" when the concentration of its undissociated species is too low to be measured. Any aqueous acid with a pK_{a} value of less than 0 is almost completely deprotonated and is considered a strong acid. All such acids transfer their protons to water and form the solvent cation species (H_{3}O^{+} in aqueous solution) so that they all have essentially the same acidity, a phenomenon known as solvent leveling. They are said to be fully dissociated in aqueous solution because the amount of undissociated acid, in equilibrium with the dissociation products, is below the detection limit. Likewise, any aqueous base with an association constant pK_{b} less than about 0, corresponding to pK_{a} greater than about 14, is leveled to OH^{−} and is considered a strong base.

Nitric acid, with a pK value of around −1.7, behaves as a strong acid in aqueous solutions with a pH greater than 1. At lower pH values it behaves as a weak acid.

pK_{a} values for strong acids have been estimated by theoretical means. For example, the pK_{a} value of aqueous HCl has been estimated as −9.3.

== Monoprotic acids ==
Variation of the % formation of a monoprotic acid, AH, and its conjugate base, A^{−}, with the difference between the pH and the pK_{a} of the acid.

After rearranging the expression defining K_{a}, and putting pH = −log_{10}[H^{+}], one obtains

$$\mathrm{pH} = \mathrm{p}K_\text{a} + \log\mathrm{\frac{[A^-]}{[HA]}}$$

This is the Henderson–Hasselbalch equation, from which the following conclusions can be drawn.

- At half-neutralization the ratio ([A^{−}])/[HA] = 1; since log(1) = 0, the pH at half-neutralization is numerically equal to pK_{a}. Conversely, when pH = pK_{a}, the concentration of HA is equal to the concentration of A^{−}.
- The buffer region extends over the approximate range pK_{a} ± 2. Buffering is weak outside the range pK_{a} ± 1. At pH ≤ pK_{a} − 2 the substance is said to be fully protonated and at pH ≥ pK_{a} + 2 it is fully dissociated (deprotonated).
- If the pH is known, the ratio may be calculated. This ratio is independent of the analytical concentration of the acid.

In water, measurable pK_{a} values range from about −2 for a strong acid to about 12 for a very weak acid (or strong base).

A buffer solution of a desired pH can be prepared as a mixture of a weak acid and its conjugate base. In practice, the mixture can be created by dissolving the acid in water, and adding the requisite amount of strong acid or base. When the pK_{a} and analytical concentration of the acid are known, the extent of dissociation and pH of a solution of a monoprotic acid can be easily calculated using an ICE table.

== Polyprotic acids ==
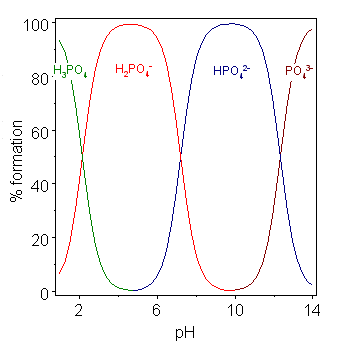
Phosphoric acid speciation

A polyprotic acid is a compound which may lose more than 1 proton. Stepwise dissociation constants are each defined for the loss of a single proton. The constant for dissociation of the first proton may be denoted as K_{a1} and the constants for dissociation of successive protons as K_{a2}, etc. Phosphoric acid, H_{3}PO_{4}, is an example of a polyprotic acid as it can lose three protons.

Equilibrium	pK definition and value
$\ce{H3PO4 <=> H2PO4- + H+}$	$\mathrm{p}K_\ce{a1} = \log_{10} \frac{[\ce{H_3PO_4}]}{[\ce{H_2PO_4^{-}}][\ce{H^+}]} = 2.14$
$\ce{H2PO4- <=> HPO4^2- + H+}$	$\mathrm{p}K_\ce{a2} = \log_{10} \frac{[\ce{H_2PO_4^{-}}]}{[\ce{HPO_4^{2-}}][\ce{H^+}]} = 7.2$
$\ce{HPO4^2- <=> PO4^3- + H+}$	$\mathrm{p}K_\ce{a3} = \log_{10} \frac{[\ce{HPO4^2-}]}{[\ce{PO4^3-}][\ce{H+}]} = 12.37$

When the difference between successive pK values is about four or more, as in this example, each species may be considered as an acid in its own right; In fact salts of H_{2}PO^{−}_{4} may be crystallised from solution by adjustment of pH to about 5.5 and salts of HPO^{2−}_{4} may be crystallised from solution by adjustment of pH to about 10. The species distribution diagram shows that the concentrations of the two ions are maximum at pH 5.5 and 10.

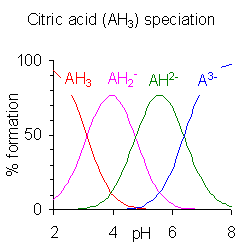
% species formation calculated with the program HySS for a 10 millimolar solution of citric acid. pK_{a1} = 3.13, pK_{a2} = 4.76, pK_{a3} = 6.40.

When the difference between successive pK values is less than about four there is overlap between the pH range of existence of the species in equilibrium. The smaller the difference, the more the overlap. The case of citric acid is shown at the right; solutions of citric acid are buffered over the whole range of pH 2.5 to 7.5.

According to Pauling's first rule, successive pK values of a given acid increase (pK_{a2} > pK_{a1}). For oxyacids with more than one ionizable hydrogen on the same atom, the pK_{a} values often increase by about 5 units for each proton removed, as in the example of phosphoric acid above.

It can be seen in the table above that the second proton is removed from a negatively charged species. Since the proton carries a positive charge extra work is needed to remove it, which is why pK_{a2} is greater than pK_{a1}. pK_{a3} is greater than pK_{a2} because there is further charge separation. When an exception to Pauling's rule is found, it indicates that a major change in structure is also occurring. In the case of VO^{+}_{2}(aq), the vanadium is octahedral, 6-coordinate, whereas vanadic acid is tetrahedral, 4-coordinate. This means that four "particles" are released with the first dissociation, but only two "particles" are released with the other dissociations, resulting in a much greater entropy contribution to the standard Gibbs free energy change for the first reaction than for the others.

Equilibrium	pK_{a}
$\ce{[VO2(H2O)4]+ <=> H3VO4 + H+ + 2H2O}$	$\mathrm{p}K_{a_1} = 4.2$
$\ce{H3VO4 <=> H2VO4- + H+}$	$\mathrm{p}K_{a_2} = 2.60$
$\ce{H2VO4- <=> HVO4^2- + H+}$	$\mathrm{p}K_{a_3} = 7.92$
$\ce{HVO4^2- <=> VO4^3- + H+}$	$\mathrm{p}K_{a_4} = 13.27$

=== Isoelectric point ===
For substances in solution, the isoelectric point (pI) is defined as the pH at which the sum, weighted by charge value, of concentrations of positively charged species is equal to the weighted sum of concentrations of negatively charged species. In the case that there is one species of each type, the isoelectric point can be obtained directly from the pK values. Take the example of glycine, defined as AH. There are two dissociation equilibria to consider.

$$\ce{AH2+ <=> AH~+ H+ \qquad [AH][H+] = \mathit{K}_1 [AH2+]}$$
$$\ce{AH <=> A^-~+H+ \qquad [A^- ][H+] = \mathit{K}_2 [AH]}$$

Substitute the expression for [AH] from the second equation into the first equation

$$\ce{[A^- ][H+]^2 = \mathit{K}_1 \mathit{K}_2 [AH2+]}$$

At the isoelectric point the concentration of the positively charged species, AH^{+}_{2}, is equal to the concentration of the negatively charged species, A^{−}, so

$$[\ce{H+}]^2 = K_1 K_2$$

Therefore, taking cologarithms, the pH is given by

$$\mathrm{p}I = \frac{\mathrm{p}K_1 + \mathrm{p}K_2}{2}$$

pI values for amino acids are listed at proteinogenic amino acid. When more than two charged species are in equilibrium with each other a full speciation calculation may be needed.

== Bases and basicity ==
The equilibrium constant K_{b} for a base is usually defined as the association constant for protonation of the base, B, to form the conjugate acid, HB^{+}.
$$\ce{B + H2O <=> HB+ + OH-}$$

Using similar reasoning to that used before
$$\begin{align}
K_\text{b} &= \mathrm{\frac{[HB^+] [OH^-]}{[B]}} \\
\mathrm{p}K_\text{b} &= - \log_{10}\left(K_\text{b}\right)
\end{align}$$

K_{b} is related to K_{a} for the conjugate acid. In water, the concentration of the hydroxide ion, [OH^{−}], is related to the concentration of the hydrogen ion by K_{w} = [H^{+}][OH^{−}], therefore
$$\mathrm{[OH^-]} = \frac{K_\mathrm{w}}{\mathrm{[H^+]}}$$

Substitution of the expression for [OH^{−}] into the expression for K_{b} gives
$$K_\text{b} = \frac{[\mathrm{HB^+}]K_\text{w}}{\mathrm{[B] [H^+]}} = \frac{K_\text{w}}{K_\text{a}}$$

When K_{a}, K_{b} and K_{w} are determined under the same conditions of temperature and ionic strength, it follows, taking cologarithms, that pK_{b} = pK_{w} − pK_{a}. In aqueous solutions at 25 °C, pK_{w} is 13.9965, so

$$\mathrm{p}K_\text{b} \approx 14 - \mathrm{p}K_\text{a}$$

with sufficient accuracy for most practical purposes. In effect there is no need to define pK_{b} separately from pK_{a}, but it is done here as often only pK_{b} values can be found in the older literature.

For a hydrolyzed metal ion, K_{b} can also be defined as a stepwise dissociation constant
$$\begin{align}
\mathrm{M}_p(\ce{OH})_q &\leftrightharpoons \mathrm{M}_p(\ce{OH})^{+}_{q-1} + \ce{OH-}\\
K_\mathrm{b} &= \frac{[\mathrm{M}_p(\ce{OH})^{+}_{q-1}] [\ce{OH-}]}{[\mathrm{M}_p(\ce{OH})_q]}\\
\end{align}$$

This is the reciprocal of an association constant for formation of the complex.

=== Basicity expressed as dissociation constant of conjugate acid ===
Because the relationship pK_{b} = pK_{w} − pK_{a} holds only in aqueous solutions (though analogous relationships apply for other amphoteric solvents), subdisciplines of chemistry like organic chemistry that usually deal with nonaqueous solutions generally do not use pK_{b} as a measure of basicity. Instead, the pK_{a} of the conjugate acid, denoted by pK_{aH}, is quoted when basicity needs to be quantified. For base B and its conjugate acid BH^{+} in equilibrium, this is defined as
$$\mathrm{p}K_\mathrm{aH}(\mathrm{B})=\mathrm{p}K_\mathrm{a}(\ce{BH+})=-\log_{10}\Big(\frac{[\ce{B}][\ce{H+}]}{[\ce{BH+}]}\Big)$$

A higher value for pK_{aH} corresponds to a stronger base. For example, the values pK_{aH} (C_{5}H_{5}N) = 5.25 and pK_{aH} ((CH_{3}CH_{2})_{3}N) = 10.75 indicate that (CH_{3}CH_{2})_{3}N (triethylamine) is a stronger base than C_{5}H_{5}N (pyridine).

== Amphoteric substances ==
An amphoteric substance is one that can act as an acid or as a base, depending on pH. Water (below) is amphoteric. Another example of an amphoteric molecule is the bicarbonate ion HCO^{−}_{3} that is the conjugate base of the carbonic acid molecule H_{2}CO_{3} in the equilibrium

H_{2}CO_{3} + H_{2}O ⇌ HCO^{−}_{3} + H_{3}O^{+}

but also the conjugate acid of the carbonate ion CO^{2−}_{3} in (the reverse of) the equilibrium

HCO^{−}_{3} + OH^{−} ⇌ CO^{2−}_{3} + H_{2}O

Carbonic acid equilibria are important for acid–base homeostasis in the human body.

An amino acid is also amphoteric with the added complication that the neutral molecule is subject to an internal acid–base equilibrium in which the basic amino group attracts and binds the proton from the acidic carboxyl group, forming a zwitterion.

NH_{2}CHRCO_{2}H ⇌ N^{+}H_{3}CHRCO^{−}_{2}

At pH less than about 5 both the carboxylate group and the amino group are protonated. As pH increases the acid dissociates according to

N^{+}H_{3}CHRCO_{2}H ⇌ N^{+}H_{3}CHRCO^{−}_{2} + H^{+}

At high pH a second dissociation may take place.

N^{+}H_{3}CHRCO^{−}_{2} ⇌ NH_{2}CHRCO^{−}_{2} + H^{+}

Thus the amino acid molecule is amphoteric because it may either be protonated or deprotonated.

=== Water self-ionization ===
The water molecule may either gain or lose a proton. It is said to be amphiprotic. The ionization equilibrium can be written

$$\ce{H2O <=> OH- + H+}$$

where in aqueous solution H^{+} denotes a solvated proton. Often this is written as the hydronium ion H_{3}O^{+}, but this formula is not exact because in fact there is solvation by more than one water molecule and species such as H_{5}O^{+}_{2}, H_{7}O^{+}_{3}, and H_{9}O^{+}_{4} are also present.

The equilibrium constant is given by

$$K_\text{a} = \mathrm{\frac{[H^+] [OH^-]}{[H_2O]}}$$

With solutions in which the solute concentrations are not very high, the concentration [H_{2}O] can be assumed to be constant, regardless of solute(s); this expression may then be replaced by

$$K_\text{w} = [\mathrm{H}^+] [\mathrm{OH}^-]\,$$

The self-ionization constant of water, K_{w}, is thus just a special case of an acid dissociation constant. A logarithmic form analogous to pK_{a} may also be defined

$$\mathrm{p}K_\text{w} = - \log_{10}\left(K_\text{w}\right)$$

pK_{w} values for pure water at various temperatures
T (°C)	0	5	10	15	20	25	30	35	40	45	50
pK_{w}	14.943	14.734	14.535	14.346	14.167	13.997	13.830	13.680	13.535	13.396	13.262

These data can be modelled by a parabola with

$$\mathrm p K_\mathrm w = 14.94 - 0.04209\ T + 0.0001718\ T^2$$

From this equation, pK_{w} = 14 at 24.87 °C. At that temperature both hydrogen and hydroxide ions have a concentration of 10^{−7} M.

== Acidity in nonaqueous solutions ==
A solvent will be more likely to promote ionization of a dissolved acidic molecule in the following circumstances:

1. It is a protic solvent, capable of forming hydrogen bonds.
2. It has a high donor number, making it a strong Lewis base.
3. It has a high dielectric constant (relative permittivity), making it a good solvent for ionic species.

pK_{a} values of organic compounds are often obtained using the aprotic solvents dimethyl sulfoxide (DMSO) and acetonitrile (ACN).

Solvent properties at 25 °C
Solvent	Donor number	Dielectric constant
Acetonitrile	14	37
Dimethylsulfoxide	30	47
Water	18	78

DMSO is widely used as an alternative to water because it has a lower dielectric constant than water, and is less polar and so dissolves non-polar, hydrophobic substances more easily. It has a measurable pK_{a} range of about 1 to 30. Acetonitrile is less basic than DMSO, and, so, in general, acids are weaker and bases are stronger in this solvent. Some pK_{a} values at 25 °C for acetonitrile (ACN) and dimethyl sulfoxide (DMSO). are shown in the following tables. Values for water are included for comparison.

pK_{a} values of acids
HA ⇌ A^{−} + H^{+}	ACN	DMSO	Water
p-Toluenesulfonic acid	8.5	0.9	Strong
2,4-Dinitrophenol	16.66	5.1	3.9
Benzoic acid	21.51	11.1	4.2
Acetic acid	23.51	12.6	4.756
Phenol	29.14	18.0	9.99
BH^{+} ⇌ B + H^{+}	ACN	DMSO	Water
Pyrrolidine	19.56	10.8	11.4
Triethylamine	18.82	9.0	10.72
Proton sponge	18.62	7.5	12.1
Pyridine	12.53	3.4	5.2
Aniline	10.62	3.6	4.6

Ionization of acids is less in an acidic solvent than in water. For example, hydrogen chloride is a weak acid when dissolved in acetic acid. This is because acetic acid is a much weaker base than water.

$$\ce{HCl + CH3CO2H <=> Cl- + CH3C(OH)2+}$$
$$\text{acid} + \text{base } \ce{<=>} \text{ conjugate base} + \text{conjugate acid}$$

Compare this reaction with what happens when acetic acid is dissolved in the more acidic solvent pure sulfuric acid:

$$\ce{H2SO4 + CH3CO2H <=> HSO4- + CH3C(OH)2+}$$

Dimerization of a carboxylic acid.

The unlikely geminal diol species CH_{3}C(OH)^{+}_{2} is stable in these environments. For aqueous solutions the pH scale is the most convenient acidity function. Other acidity functions have been proposed for non-aqueous media, the most notable being the Hammett acidity function, H_{0}, for superacid media and its modified version H_{−} for superbasic media.

In aprotic solvents, oligomers, such as the well-known acetic acid dimer, may be formed by hydrogen bonding. An acid may also form hydrogen bonds to its conjugate base. This process, known as homoconjugation, has the effect of enhancing the acidity of acids, lowering their effective pK_{a} values, by stabilizing the conjugate base. Homoconjugation enhances the proton-donating power of toluenesulfonic acid in acetonitrile solution by a factor of nearly 800.

In aqueous solutions, homoconjugation does not occur, because water forms stronger hydrogen bonds to the conjugate base than does the acid.

=== Mixed solvents ===
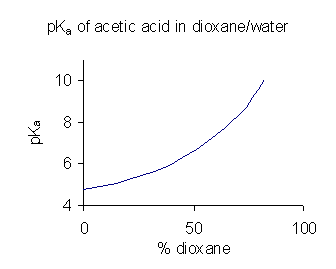
pK_{a} of acetic acid in dioxane/water mixtures. Data at 25 °C from Pine et al.

When a compound has limited solubility in water it is common practice (in the pharmaceutical industry, for example) to determine pK_{a} values in a solvent mixture such as water/dioxane or water/methanol, in which the compound is more soluble. In the example shown at the right, the pK_{a} value rises steeply with increasing percentage of dioxane as the dielectric constant of the mixture is decreasing.

A pK_{a} value obtained in a mixed solvent cannot be used directly for aqueous solutions. The reason for this is that when the solvent is in its standard state its activity is defined as one. For example, the standard state of water:dioxane mixture with 9:1 mixing ratio is precisely that solvent mixture, with no added solutes. To obtain the pK_{a} value for use with aqueous solutions it has to be extrapolated to zero co-solvent concentration from values obtained from various co-solvent mixtures.

These facts are obscured by the omission of the solvent from the expression that is normally used to define pK_{a}, but pK_{a} values obtained in a given mixed solvent can be compared to each other, giving relative acid strengths. The same is true of pK_{a} values obtained in a particular non-aqueous solvent such a DMSO.

A universal, solvent-independent, scale for acid dissociation constants has not been developed, since there is no known way to compare the standard states of two different solvents.

== Factors that affect pK_{a} values ==
Pauling's second rule is that the value of the first pK_{a} for acids of the formula XO_{m}(OH)_{n} depends primarily on the number of oxo groups m, and is approximately independent of the number of hydroxy groups n, and also of the central atom X. Approximate values of pK_{a} are 8 for m = 0, 2 for m = 1, −3 for m = 2 and < −10 for m = 3. Alternatively, various numerical formulas have been proposed including pK_{a} = 8 − 5m (known as Bell's rule), pK_{a} = 7 − 5m, or pK_{a} = 9 − 7m. The dependence on m correlates with the oxidation state of the central atom, X: the higher the oxidation state the stronger the oxyacid.

For example, pK_{a} for HClO is 7.2, for HClO_{2} is 2.0, for HClO_{3} is −1 and HClO_{4} is a strong acid (pK_{a} ≪ 0). The increased acidity on adding an oxo group is due to stabilization of the conjugate base by delocalization of its negative charge over an additional oxygen atom. This rule can help assign molecular structure: for example, phosphorous acid, having molecular formula H_{3}PO_{3}, has a pK_{a} near 2, which suggested that the structure is HPO(OH)_{2}, as later confirmed by NMR spectroscopy, and not P(OH)_{3}, which would be expected to have a pK_{a} near 8.

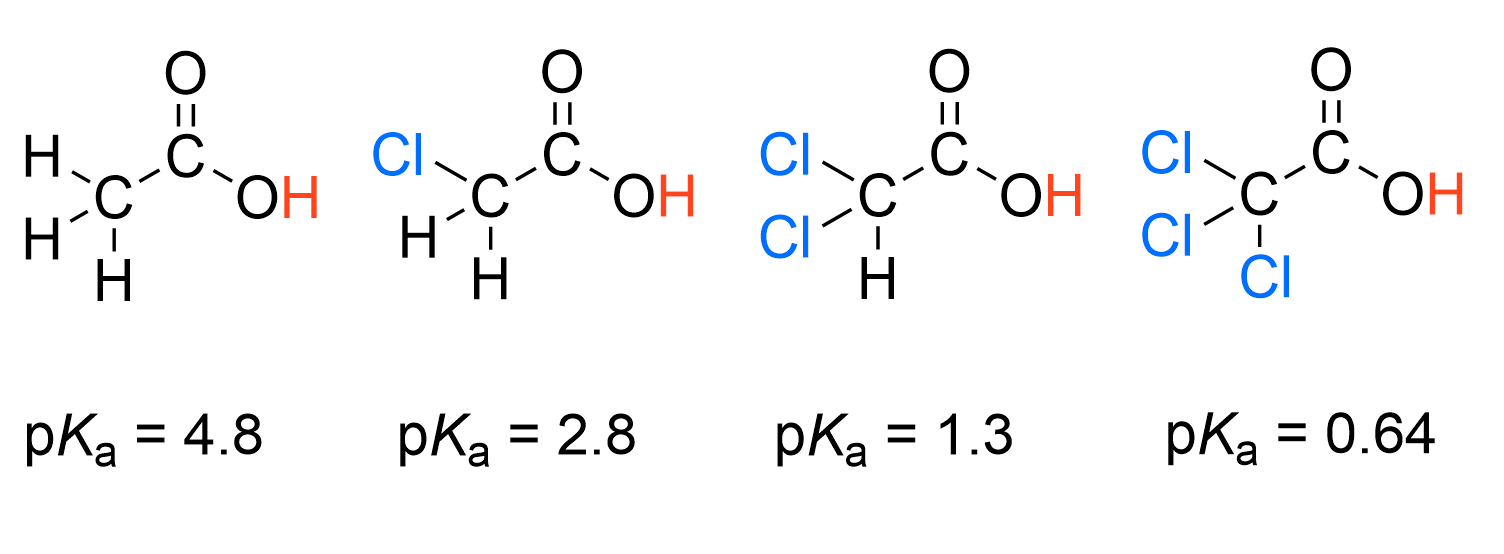
pKa values for acetic, chloroacetic, dichloroacetic and trichloroacetic acids.

Inductive effects and mesomeric effects affect the pK_{a} values. A simple example is provided by the effect of replacing the hydrogen atoms in acetic acid by the more electronegative chlorine atom. The electron-withdrawing effect of the substituent makes ionisation easier, so successive pK_{a} values decrease in the series 4.7, 2.8, 1.4, and 0.7 when 0, 1, 2, or 3 chlorine atoms are present. The Hammett equation, provides a general expression for the effect of substituents.

log(K_{a}) = log(K^{0}_{a}) + ρσ.

K_{a} is the dissociation constant of a substituted compound, K^{0}_{a} is the dissociation constant when the substituent is hydrogen, ρ is a property of the unsubstituted compound and σ has a particular value for each substituent. A plot of log(K_{a}) against σ is a straight line with intercept log(K^{0}_{a}) and slope ρ. This is an example of a linear free energy relationship as log(K_{a}) is proportional to the standard free energy change. Hammett originally formulated the relationship with data from benzoic acid with different substituents in the ortho- and para- positions: some numerical values are in Hammett equation. This and other studies allowed substituents to be ordered according to their electron-withdrawing or electron-releasing power, and to distinguish between inductive and mesomeric effects.

Alcohols do not normally behave as acids in water, but the presence of a double bond adjacent to the OH group can substantially decrease the pK_{a} by the mechanism of keto–enol tautomerism. Ascorbic acid is an example of this effect. The diketone 2,4-pentanedione (acetylacetone) is also a weak acid because of the keto–enol equilibrium. In aromatic compounds, such as phenol, which have an OH substituent, conjugation with the aromatic ring as a whole greatly increases the stability of the deprotonated form.

Fumaric acid

Maleic acid

Structural effects can also be important. The difference between fumaric acid and maleic acid is a classic example. Fumaric acid is (E)-1,4-but-2-enedioic acid, a trans isomer, whereas maleic acid is the corresponding cis isomer, i.e. (Z)-1,4-but-2-enedioic acid (see cis-trans isomerism). Fumaric acid has pK_{a} values of approximately 3.0 and 4.5. By contrast, maleic acid has pK_{a} values of approximately 1.5 and 6.5. The reason for this large difference is that when one proton is removed from the cis isomer (maleic acid) a strong intramolecular hydrogen bond is formed with the nearby remaining carboxyl group. This favors the formation of the maleate H^{+}, and it opposes the removal of the second proton from that species. In the trans isomer, the two carboxyl groups are always far apart, so hydrogen bonding is not observed.

Proton sponge

Proton sponge, 1,8-bis(dimethylamino)naphthalene, has a pK_{a} value of 12.1. It is one of the strongest amine bases known. The high basicity is attributed to the relief of strain upon protonation and strong internal hydrogen bonding.

Effects of the solvent and solvation should be mentioned also in this section. It turns out, these influences are more subtle than that of a dielectric medium mentioned above. For example, the expected (by electronic effects of methyl substituents) and observed in gas phase order of basicity of methylamines, Me_{3}N > Me_{2}NH > MeNH_{2} > NH_{3}, is changed by water to Me_{2}NH > MeNH_{2} > Me_{3}N > NH_{3}. Neutral methylamine molecules are hydrogen-bonded to water molecules mainly through one acceptor, N–HOH, interaction and only occasionally just one more donor bond, NH–OH_{2}. Hence, methylamines are stabilized to about the same extent by hydration, regardless of the number of methyl groups. In stark contrast, corresponding methylammonium cations always utilize all the available protons for donor NH–OH_{2} bonding. Relative stabilization of methylammonium ions thus decreases with the number of methyl groups explaining the order of water basicity of methylamines.

=== Thermodynamics ===
An equilibrium constant is related to the standard Gibbs energy change for the reaction, so for an acid dissociation constant

$$\Delta G^\ominus = -RT \ln K_\text{a} \approx 2.303 RT\ \mathrm{p}K_\text{a}$$.

R is the gas constant and T is the absolute temperature. Note that pK_{a} = −log(K_{a}) and 2.303 ≈ ln(10). At 25 °C, ΔG^{⊖} in kJ·mol^{−1} ≈ 5.708 pK_{a} (1 kJ·mol^{−1} = 1000 joules per mole). Free energy is made up of an enthalpy term and an entropy term.

$$\Delta G^\ominus = \Delta H^\ominus - T \Delta S^\ominus$$

The standard enthalpy change can be determined by calorimetry or by using the van 't Hoff equation, though the calorimetric method is preferable. When both the standard enthalpy change and acid dissociation constant have been determined, the standard entropy change is easily calculated from the equation above. In the following table, the entropy terms are calculated from the experimental values of pK_{a} and ΔH^{⊖}. The data were critically selected and refer to 25 °C and zero ionic strength, in water.

Acids
Compound	Equilibrium	pK_{a}	ΔG^{⊖} (kJ·mol^{−1}) (Note: ΔG^{⊖} ≈ 2.303RTpK_{a})	ΔH^{⊖} (kJ·mol^{−1})	−TΔS^{⊖} (kJ·mol^{−1}) (Note: Computed here, from ΔH and ΔG values supplied in the citation, using −TΔS^{⊖} = ΔG^{⊖} − ΔH^{⊖})
HA = Acetic acid	HA ⇌ H^{+} + A^{−}	4.756	27.147	−0.41	27.56
H_{2}A^{+} = GlycineH^{+}	H_{2}A^{+} ⇌ HA + H^{+}	2.351	13.420	4.00	9.419
	HA ⇌ H^{+} + A^{−}	9.78	55.825	44.20	11.6
H_{2}A = Maleic acid	H_{2}A ⇌ HA^{−} + H^{+}	1.92	10.76	1.10	9.85
	HA^{−} ⇌ H^{+} + A^{2−}	6.27	35.79	−3.60	39.4
H_{3}A = Citric acid	H_{3}A ⇌ H_{2}A^{−} + H^{+}	3.128	17.855	4.07	13.78
	H_{2}A^{−} ⇌ HA^{2−} + H^{+}	4.76	27.176	2.23	24.9
	HA^{2−} ⇌ A^{3−} + H^{+}	6.40	36.509	−3.38	39.9
H_{3}A = Boric acid	H_{3}A ⇌ H_{2}A^{−} + H^{+}	9.237	52.725	13.80	38.92
H_{3}A = Phosphoric acid	H_{3}A ⇌ H_{2}A^{−} + H^{+}	2.148	12.261	−8.00	20.26
	H_{2}A^{−} ⇌ HA^{2−} + H^{+}	7.20	41.087	3.60	37.5
	HA^{2−} ⇌ A^{3−} + H^{+}	12.35	80.49	16.00	54.49
HA^{−} = Hydrogen sulfate	HA^{−} ⇌ A^{2−} + H^{+}	1.99	11.36	−22.40	33.74
H_{2}A = Oxalic acid	H_{2}A ⇌ HA^{−} + H^{+}	1.27	7.27	−3.90	11.15
	HA^{−} ⇌ A^{2−} + H^{+}	4.266	24.351	−7.00	31.35

Conjugate acids of bases
Compound	Equilibrium	pK_{a}	ΔH^{⊖} (kJ·mol^{−1})	−TΔS^{⊖} (kJ·mol^{−1})
B = Ammonia	HB^{+} ⇌ B + H^{+}	9.245	51.95	0.8205
B = Methylamine	HB^{+} ⇌ B + H^{+}	10.645	55.34	5.422
B = Triethylamine	HB^{+} ⇌ B + H^{+}	10.72	43.13	18.06

The first point to note is that, when pK_{a} is positive, the standard free energy change for the dissociation reaction is also positive. Second, some reactions are exothermic and some are endothermic, but, when ΔH^{⊖} is negative TΔS^{⊖} is the dominant factor, which determines that ΔG^{⊖} is positive. Last, the entropy contribution is always unfavourable (ΔS^{⊖} < 0) in these reactions. Ions in aqueous solution tend to orient the surrounding water molecules, which orders the solution and decreases the entropy. The contribution of an ion to the entropy is the partial molar entropy which is often negative, especially for small or highly charged ions. The ionization of a neutral acid involves formation of two ions so that the entropy decreases (ΔS^{⊖} < 0). On the second ionization of the same acid, there are now three ions and the anion has a charge, so the entropy again decreases.

Note that the standard free energy change for the reaction is for the changes from the reactants in their standard states to the products in their standard states. The free energy change at equilibrium is zero since the chemical potentials of reactants and products are equal at equilibrium.

== Experimental determination ==
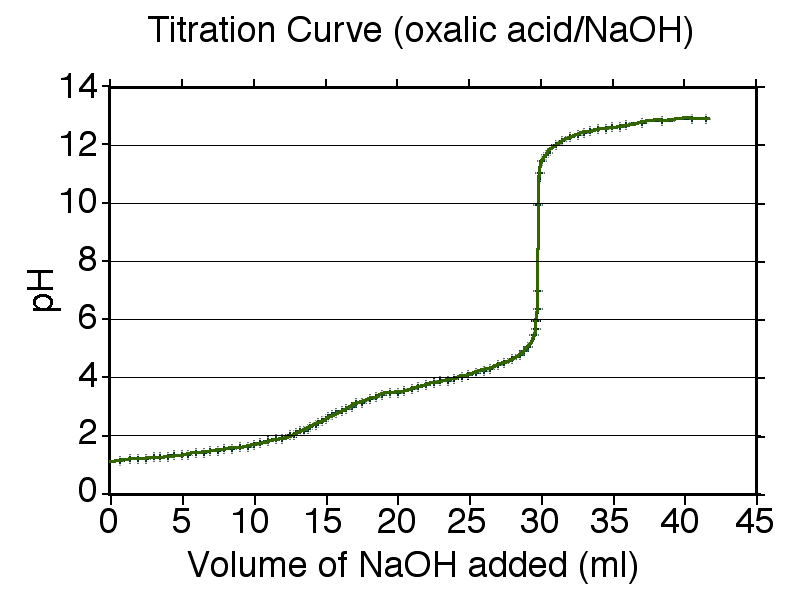
A calculated titration curve of oxalic acid titrated with a solution of sodium hydroxide

The experimental determination of pK_{a} values is commonly performed by means of titrations, in a medium of high ionic strength and at constant temperature. A typical procedure would be as follows. A solution of the compound in the medium is acidified with a strong acid to the point where the compound is fully protonated. The solution is then titrated with a strong base until all the protons have been removed. At each point in the titration pH is measured using a glass electrode and a pH meter. The equilibrium constants are found by fitting calculated pH values to the observed values, using the method of least squares.

The total volume of added strong base should be small compared to the initial volume of titrand solution in order to keep the ionic strength nearly constant. This will ensure that pK_{a} remains invariant during the titration.

A calculated titration curve for oxalic acid is shown at the right. Oxalic acid has pK_{a} values of 1.27 and 4.27. Therefore, the buffer regions will be centered at about pH 1.3 and pH 4.3. The buffer regions carry the information necessary to get the pK_{a} values as the concentrations of acid and conjugate base change along a buffer region.

Between the two buffer regions there is an end-point, or equivalence point, at about pH 3. This end-point is not sharp and is typical of a diprotic acid whose buffer regions overlap by a small amount: pK_{a2} − pK_{a1} is about three in this example. (If the difference in pK values were about two or less, the end-point would not be noticeable.) The second end-point begins at about pH 6.3 and is sharp. This indicates that all the protons have been removed. When this is so, the solution is not buffered and the pH rises steeply on addition of a small amount of strong base. However, the pH does not continue to rise indefinitely. A new buffer region begins at about pH 11 (pK_{w} − 3), which is where self-ionization of water becomes important.

It is very difficult to measure pH values of less than two in aqueous solution with a glass electrode, because the Nernst equation breaks down at such low pH values. To determine pK values of less than about 2 or more than about 11 spectrophotometric or NMR measurements may be used instead of, or combined with, pH measurements.

When the glass electrode cannot be employed, as with non-aqueous solutions, spectrophotometric methods are frequently used. These may involve absorbance or fluorescence measurements. In both cases the measured quantity is assumed to be proportional to the sum of contributions from each photo-active species; with absorbance measurements the Beer–Lambert law is assumed to apply.

Isothermal titration calorimetry (ITC) may be used to determine both a pK value and the corresponding standard enthalpy for acid dissociation. Software to perform the calculations is supplied by the instrument manufacturers for simple systems.

Aqueous solutions with normal water cannot be used for ^{1}H NMR measurements but heavy water, D_{2}O, must be used instead. ^{13}C NMR data, however, can be used with normal water and ^{1}H NMR spectra can be used with non-aqueous media. The quantities measured with NMR are time-averaged chemical shifts, as proton exchange is fast on the NMR time-scale. Other chemical shifts, such as those of ^{31}P can be measured.

=== Micro-constants ===
Cysteine

For some polyprotic acids, dissociation (or association) occurs at more than one nonequivalent site, and the observed macroscopic equilibrium constant, or macro-constant, is a combination of micro-constants involving distinct species. When one reactant forms two products in parallel, the macro-constant is a sum of two micro-constants, $K = K_X + K_Y.$ This is true for example for the deprotonation of the amino acid cysteine, which exists in solution as a neutral zwitterion HS−CH_{2}−CH(NH^{+}_{3})−COO^{−}. The two micro-constants represent deprotonation either at sulphur or at nitrogen, and the macro-constant sum here is the acid dissociation constant $K_\mathrm a = K_\mathrm a \ce{(-SH)} + K_\mathrm a \ce{(-NH3+)}.$

Spermine

Similarly, a base such as spermine has more than one site where protonation can occur. For example, mono-protonation can occur at a terminal −NH_{2} group or at internal −NH− groups. The K_{b} values for dissociation of spermine protonated at one or other of the sites are examples of micro-constants. They cannot be determined directly by means of pH, absorbance, fluorescence or NMR measurements; a measured K_{b} value is the sum of the K values for the micro-reactions.

$$K_\text{b} = K_\text{terminal} + K_\text{internal}$$

Nevertheless, the site of protonation is very important for biological function, so mathematical methods have been developed for the determination of micro-constants.

When two reactants form a single product in parallel, the macro-constant $1/K = 1/K_X + 1/K_Y .$ For example, the abovementioned equilibrium for spermine may be considered in terms of K_{a} values of two tautomeric conjugate acids, with macro-constant In this case $1/K_\text{a} = 1/K_{\text{a},\text{terminal}} + 1/K_{\text{a},\text{internal}}.$ This is equivalent to the preceding expression since $K_\mathrm{b}$ is proportional to $1/K_\mathrm{a}.$

When a reactant undergoes two reactions in series, the macro-constant for the combined reaction is the product of the micro-constant for the two steps. For example, the abovementioned cysteine zwitterion can lose two protons, one from sulphur and one from nitrogen, and the overall macro-constant for losing two protons is the product of two dissociation constants $K = K_\mathrm a \ce{(-SH)} K_\mathrm a \ce{(-NH3+)}.$ This can also be written in terms of logarithmic constants as $\mathrm p K = \mathrm p K_\mathrm a \ce{(-SH)} + \mathrm p K_\mathrm a \ce{(-NH3+)}.$

== Applications and significance ==
A knowledge of pK_{a} values is important for the quantitative treatment of systems involving acid–base equilibria in solution. Many applications exist in biochemistry; for example, the pK_{a} values of proteins and amino acid side chains are of major importance for the activity of enzymes and the stability of proteins. Protein pK_{a} values cannot always be measured directly, but may be calculated using theoretical methods. Buffer solutions are used extensively to provide solutions at or near the physiological pH for the study of biochemical reactions; the design of these solutions depends on a knowledge of the pK_{a} values of their components. Important buffer solutions include MOPS, which provides a solution with pH 7.2, and tricine, which is used in gel electrophoresis. Buffering is an essential part of acid base physiology including acid–base homeostasis, and is key to understanding disorders such as acid–base disorder. The isoelectric point of a given molecule is a function of its pK values, so different molecules have different isoelectric points. This permits a technique called isoelectric focusing, which is used for separation of proteins by 2-D gel polyacrylamide gel electrophoresis.

Buffer solutions also play a key role in analytical chemistry. They are used whenever there is a need to fix the pH of a solution at a particular value. Compared with an aqueous solution, the pH of a buffer solution is relatively insensitive to the addition of a small amount of strong acid or strong base. The buffer capacity of a simple buffer solution is largest when pH = pK_{a}. In acid–base extraction, the efficiency of extraction of a compound into an organic phase, such as an ether, can be optimised by adjusting the pH of the aqueous phase using an appropriate buffer. At the optimum pH, the concentration of the electrically neutral species is maximised; such a species is more soluble in organic solvents having a low dielectric constant than it is in water. This technique is used for the purification of weak acids and bases.

A pH indicator is a weak acid or weak base that changes colour in the transition pH range, which is approximately pK_{a} ± 1. The design of a universal indicator requires a mixture of indicators whose adjacent pK_{a} values differ by about two, so that their transition pH ranges just overlap.

In pharmacology, ionization of a compound alters its physical behaviour and macro properties such as solubility and lipophilicity, log p). For example, ionization of any compound will increase the solubility in water, but decrease the lipophilicity. This is exploited in drug development to increase the concentration of a compound in the blood by adjusting the pK_{a} of an ionizable group.

Knowledge of pK_{a} values is important for the understanding of coordination complexes, which are formed by the interaction of a metal ion, M^{m+}, acting as a Lewis acid, with a ligand, L, acting as a Lewis base. However, the ligand may also undergo protonation reactions, so the formation of a complex in aqueous solution could be represented symbolically by the reaction

$$[\ce{M(H2O)_\mathit{n}}]^{m+} + \ce{LH <=> } \ [\ce{M(H2O)}_{n - 1} \ce{L}]^{(m - 1)+} + \ce{H3O+}$$

To determine the equilibrium constant for this reaction, in which the ligand loses a proton, the pK_{a} of the protonated ligand must be known. In practice, the ligand may be polyprotic; for example EDTA^{4−} can accept four protons; in that case, all pK_{a} values must be known. In addition, the metal ion is subject to hydrolysis, that is, it behaves as a weak acid, so the pK values for the hydrolysis reactions must also be known.

Assessing the hazard associated with an acid or base may require a knowledge of pK_{a} values. For example, hydrogen cyanide is a very toxic gas, because the cyanide ion inhibits the iron-containing enzyme cytochrome c oxidase. Hydrogen cyanide is a weak acid in aqueous solution with a pK_{a} of about 9. In strongly alkaline solutions, above pH 11, say, it follows that sodium cyanide is "fully dissociated" so the hazard due to the hydrogen cyanide gas is much reduced. An acidic solution, on the other hand, is very hazardous because all the cyanide is in its acid form. Ingestion of cyanide by mouth is potentially fatal, independently of pH, because of the reaction with cytochrome c oxidase.

In environmental science acid–base equilibria are important for lakes and rivers; for example, humic acids are important components of natural waters. Another example occurs in chemical oceanography: in order to quantify the solubility of iron(III) in seawater at various salinities, the pK_{a} values for the formation of the iron(III) hydrolysis products Fe(OH)^{2+}, Fe(OH)^{+}_{2} and Fe(OH)_{3} were determined, along with the solubility product of iron hydroxide.

== Values for common substances ==
There are multiple techniques to determine the pK_{a} of a chemical, leading to some discrepancies between different sources. Well measured values are typically within 0.1 units of each other. Data presented here were taken at 25 °C in water. More values can be found in the Thermodynamics section, above. A table of pK_{a} of carbon acids, measured in DMSO, can be found on the page on carbanions.

Chemical	Equilibrium	pK_{a}
BH = Adenine	BH^{+}_{2} ⇌ BH + H^{+}	4.17
BH = Adenine	BH ⇌ B^{−} + H^{+}	9.65
H_{3}A = Arsenic acid	H_{3}A ⇌ H_{2}A^{−} + H^{+}	2.22
H_{3}A = Arsenic acid	H_{2}A^{−} ⇌ HA^{2−} + H^{+}	6.98
H_{3}A = Arsenic acid	HA^{2−} ⇌ A^{3−} + H^{+}	11.53
HA = Benzoic acid	HA ⇌ H^{+} + A^{−}	4.204
HA = Butyric acid	HA ⇌ H^{+} + A^{−}	4.82
H_{2}A = Chromic acid	H_{2}A ⇌ HA^{−} + H^{+}	0.98
H_{2}A = Chromic acid	HA^{−} ⇌ A^{2−} + H^{+}	6.5
B = Codeine	BH^{+} ⇌ B + H^{+}	8.17
HA = Cresol	HA ⇌ H^{+} + A^{−}	10.29
HA = Formic acid	HA ⇌ H^{+} + A^{−}	3.751
HA = Hydrofluoric acid	HA ⇌ H^{+} + A^{−}	3.17
HA = Hydrocyanic acid	HA ⇌ H^{+} + A^{−}	9.21
HA = Hydrogen selenide	HA ⇌ H^{+} + A^{−}	3.89
HA = Hydrogen peroxide (90%)	HA ⇌ H^{+} + A^{−}	11.7
HA = Lactic acid	HA ⇌ H^{+} + A^{−}	3.86
HA = Propionic acid	HA ⇌ H^{+} + A^{−}	4.87
HA = Phenol	HA ⇌ H^{+} + A^{−}	9.99
H_{2}A = L-(+)-Ascorbic Acid	H_{2}A ⇌ HA^{−} + H^{+}	4.17
H_{2}A = L-(+)-Ascorbic Acid	HA^{−} ⇌ A^{2−} + H^{+}	11.57

== See also ==
- Acidosis
- Acids in wine: tartaric, malic and citric are the principal acids in wine.
- Alkalosis
- Arterial blood gas
- Chemical equilibrium
- Conductivity (electrolytic)
- Grotthuss mechanism: how protons are transferred between hydronium ions and water molecules, accounting for the exceptionally high ionic mobility of the proton (animation).
- Hammett acidity function: a measure of acidity that is used for very concentrated solutions of strong acids, including superacids.
- Ion transport number
- Ocean acidification: dissolution of atmospheric carbon dioxide affects seawater pH. The reaction depends on total inorganic carbon and on solubility equilibria with solid carbonates such as limestone and dolomite.
- Law of dilution
- pCO2
- pH
- Predominance diagram: relates to equilibria involving polyoxyanions. pK_{a} values are needed to construct these diagrams.
- Proton affinity: a measure of basicity in the gas phase.
- Stability constants of complexes: formation of a complex can often be seen as a competition between proton and metal ion for a ligand, which is the product of dissociation of an acid.
