= CH2 =

CH2 could refer to:

- CH2, a postcode district in the CH postcode area
- Council House 2, an office building in Melbourne, Australia
- CH_{2}, the molecular formula of several chemical entities; see Methylene (disambiguation)
- CH_{2}, an abbreviation for compressed hydrogen
