= Lithium monoxide anion =

Names
- IUPAC name Lithium monoxide anion
- Other names Lithate

Identifiers
CAS Number	64538-53-0
3D model (JSmol)	Interactive image
CompTox Dashboard (EPA)	DTXSID901337186
- InChI: InChI=1S/Li.O/q;-1 Key: IXZJKKSRIFXCQD-UHFFFAOYSA-N
- SMILES: [Li]-[O-]

Properties
Chemical formula	LiO^{−}
Molar mass	22.94 g·mol^{−1}
Conjugate acid	Lithium hydroxide

Hazards
- Occupational safety and health (OHS/OSH)
Main hazards	Extremely corrosive

Related compounds
Related bases	Methyl anion; Diethynylbenzene dianions
- Except where otherwise noted, data are given for materials in their standard state (at 25 °C [77 °F], 100 kPa). verify (what is ?) Infobox references

Lithium monoxide anion (LiO^{−}) is a superbase existing in the gas phase. It was the strongest known base until 2008, when the isomeric diethynylbenzene dianions were determined to have a higher proton affinity. The methanide ion CH^{−}_{3} was the strongest known base before lithium monoxide anion was discovered.

LiO^{−} has a proton affinity of ~1782 kJ/mol.

== Synthesis of the lithium monoxide anion ==
The anion is prepared in a mass spectrometer by successive decarboxylation and decarbonylation of lithium oxalate anion under collision-induced dissociation (CID) conditions:

LiO−C(=O)−CO^{−}_{2} → LiO−C(=O)^{−} + CO_{2}
LiO−C(=O)^{−} → LiO^{−} + CO

The above method to synthesize the lithium monoxide anion is inefficient and difficult to carry out. The required ion rapidly reacts with traces of moisture and molecular oxygen present in the air. The reaction is further intensified by the high pressure argon that is introduced into the instrument to carry out the CID step.

== See also ==
- Lithium oxide
