= Rice table =

Rice table may refer to:

- Rijsttafel, a Dutch-Indonesian meal
- RICE table, a table used in chemistry
