= Inorganic nonaqueous solvent =

Type of nonaqueous solvents

An inorganic nonaqueous solvent is a solvent other than water, that is not an organic compound. These solvents are used in chemical research and industry for reactions that cannot occur in aqueous solutions or require a special environment. Inorganic nonaqueous solvents can be classified into two groups, protic solvents and aprotic solvents. Early studies on inorganic nonaqueous solvents evaluated ammonia, hydrogen fluoride, sulfuric acid, as well as more specialized solvents, hydrazine, and selenium oxychloride.

== Protic inorganic nonaqueous solvents ==
Prominent members include ammonia, hydrogen fluoride, sulfuric acid, hydrogen cyanide. Ammonia (and several amines as well) are useful for the generating solutions of highly reducing species because the N-H bond resists reduction. The chemistry of electrides and alkalides relies on amine solvents.

The combination of HF and SbF_{5} is the basis of a superacid solution. Using this mixture, the conjugate acid of hydrogen sulfide can be isolated:

H_{2}S + HF + SbF_{5} → [H_{3}S]SbF_{6}

=== Autoionization ===
The limiting acid in a given solvent is the solvonium ion, such as H_{3}O^{+} (hydronium) ion in water. An acid which has more of a tendency to donate a hydrogen ion than the limiting acid will be a strong acid in the solvent considered, and will exist mostly or entirely in its dissociated form. Likewise, the limiting base in a given solvent is the solvate ion, such as OH^{−} (hydroxide) ion, in water. A base which has more affinity for protons than the limiting base cannot exist in solution, as it will react with the solvent.

For example, the limiting acid in liquid ammonia is the ammonium ion, NH_{4}^{+} which has a pK_{a} value in water of 9.25. The limiting base is the amide ion, NH_{2}^{−}. NH_{2}^{−} is a stronger base than the hydroxide ion and so cannot exist in aqueous solution. The pK_{a} value of ammonia is estimated to be approximately 34 (cf. water, 14).

== Aprotic inorganic nonaqueous solvents ==
Prominent members include sulfur dioxide, sulfuryl chloride fluoride, dinitrogen tetroxide, antimony trichloride, and bromine trifluoride. These solvents have proven useful for study highly electrophilic or highly oxidizing compounds or ions. Several (SO_{2}, SO_{2}ClF, N_{2}O_{4}) are gases near room temperature, so they are handled using vacuum-line techniques.

The generation of [IS_{7}]^{+} and [BrS_{7}]^{+} are illustrative. These highly electrophilic salts are prepared in SO_{2} solution. The preparation of [SBr_{3}]^{+} salts also calls for a mixed solvent composed of SO_{2} and SO_{2}FCl. Sulfuryl chloride fluoride is often used for the synthesis of noble gas compounds.

=== Autoionization ===
Many inorganic solvents participate in autoionization reactions. In the solvent system definition of acids and bases, autoionization of solvents affords the equivalent to acids and bases. Relevant autoionizations:

2BrF_{3} $\ce{<=>>}$ BrF_{2}^{+} + BrF_{4}^{−}
N_{2}O_{4} ⇌ NO^{+} (nitrosonium) + NO_{3}^{−} (nitrate)
2SbCl_{3} ⇌ SbCl_{2}^{+} + SbCl_{4}^{−}
2POCl_{3} ⇌ POCl_{2}^{+} + POCl_{4}^{−}

According to the solvent-system definition, acids are the compounds that increase the concentration of the solvonium (positive) ions, and bases are the compounds that result in the increase of the solvate (negative) ions, where solvonium and solvate are the ions found in the pure solvent in equilibrium with its neutral molecules:

The solvent SO_{2} is relatively uncomplicated, it does not autoionize.

== See also ==
- Nonaqueous titration
- Protic solvent
