= RICE chart =

Mass balance consistency check for a chemical reaction

An ICE table or RICE box or RICE chart is a tabular system of keeping track of changing concentrations in an equilibrium reaction. This includes vaporization, pH, and solvation. ICE stands for initial, change, equilibrium. It is used in chemistry to keep track of the changes in amount of substance of the reactants and also organize a set of conditions that one wants to solve with. Some sources refer to a RICE table (or box or chart) where the added R stands for the reaction to which the table refers. Others simply call it a concentration table (for the acid–base equilibrium).

== Example ==
To illustrate the processes, we consider the case of dissolving a weak acid, HA, in water. The pH can be calculated using an ICE table. In this example, the acid is assumed to not be very weak, and that the concentration is not very dilute, so that the concentration of [OH^{−}] ions can be neglected. This is equivalent to the assumption that the final pH will be below about 6 or so. More details can be seen at pH calculations.

First, the equilibrium expression is written down.
$$\ce{HA <=> {A^-} + {H+}}$$
The columns of the table correspond to the three species in equilibrium.

(R)	[HA]	[A^{−}]	[H^{+}]
I	C_{a}	0	0
C	−x	+x	+x
E	C_{a} − x	x	x

The first row shows the reaction.

The second row, labeled I, has the initial conditions: the nominal concentration of acid is C_{a} and it is initially undissociated, so the concentrations of A^{−} and H^{+} are zero.

The third row, labeled C, specifies the change that occurs during the reaction. When the acid dissociates, its concentration changes by an amount $-x$, and the concentrations of A^{−} and H^{+} both change by an amount $+x$. This follows from consideration of mass balance (the total number of each atom/molecule must remain the same) and charge balance (the sum of the electric charges before and after the reaction must be zero).

The coefficients in front of the "x" correlate to the mole ratios of the reactants to the product. For example, if the reaction equation had 2 H^{+} ions in the product, then the "change" for that cell would be "2x"

The fourth row, labeled E, is the sum of the first two rows and shows the final concentrations of each species at equilibrium.

It can be seen from the table that, at equilibrium, [H^{+}] = x.

To find x, the acid dissociation constant (that is, the equilibrium constant for acid-base dissociation) must be specified.

$$K_\text{a} = \frac\ce{[H^+][A^-]}\ce{[HA]}$$

Substitute the concentrations with the values found in the last row of the ICE table.

$$K_\text{a} = \frac{x^2}{C_a - x}$$

$$x^2 + K_\text{a} x - K_\text{a} C_a = 0$$

With specific values for C_{a} and K_{a} this quadratic equation can be solved for x. Assuming (Note: Strictly speaking pH is equal to −log_{10}{H^{+}} where {H^{+}} is the activity of the hydrogen ion. In dilute solution concentration is almost equal to activity) that pH = −log_{10}[H^{+}] the pH can be calculated as pH = −log_{10}x.

If the degree of dissociation is quite small, C_{a} ≫ x and the expression simplifies to
$$K_\text{a} = \frac{x^2}{C_a}$$
and pH = 1/2 (pK_{a} − log C_{a}). This approximate expression is good for pK_{a} values larger than about 2 and concentrations high enough.

== RICE tables for Solvation ==
RICE tables can also be used to find solubility equilibria or find the molar solubility of reactions.

For example, the reaction $\ce{PbCl2{}_{(s)} <-> Pb^2+{}_{(aq)}+2Cl^- {}_{(aq)}}$ is given. Additionally, it is provided that the K_{sp} (the solubility product constant) = $1.7\times10^{-5}$.

(R)	$\ce{PbCl2{}_{(s)}}$	$\ce{Pb^2+{}_{(aq)}}$	2$\ce{Cl^- {}_{(aq)}}$
I	-	0	0
C	-	+x	+2x
E	-	x	2x

Because the lead(II) chloride is solid, its rate of reaction does not depend on its concentration; rather, it depends only on the surface area of the solid. The surface area is disregarded because it is not relevant for the equilibrium position. Because the calculation is of molar solubility, it is assumed that the reaction begins with only reactants (row I). To find the row C, establish that x is the molar solubility. This is the number of moles added or subtracted on each side as stated in the "Example" section. For the lead (II) ion, there is one mole added for every mole of product used. For the chloride ion, there are two moles added for every mole of product used. Row E is simply I + C.

To find the actual value of x, the solubility product constant equation can be used. The equation is the molarity (or partial pressure, for a gas) of the products over the molarity (or partial pressure) of the reactants.

$k_{sp} = \frac{[Pb^{2+}]\times[Cl^-]^2}{[PbCl_2]}$

The next step is to plug in the variables from the E row of the RICE table, along with the given solubility product constant.

$1.7\times10^{-5} = \frac{[x]\times[2x]^2}{[1]}$

The divisor is set to one, as the reactants in a solubility equation are solid (see above). Next, we can solve for x.

$1.7\times10^{-5} = 4x^3$

$4.25\times10^{-6} = x^3$

$x\approx0.016$

The molar solubility of the reaction is 0.016 (with significant figures).
