= Methylene =

Methylene may refer to:

- Methylene group or methylene bridge (CH_{2}< or equivalently −CH_{2}−), a part of a molecule connected to the rest of the molecule by two single bonds.
- An older name for methylidene group (=CH_{2}), a part of a molecule connected to another atom by a double bond.
- Methylene (compound) (CH_{2}), an organic compound.

== See also ==
- Bichloride of methylene (30% methanol and 70% chloroform), a variant of the old anesthetic A.C.E. mixture
- Methyl group
- Methylenedioxy
- Mytilene, a city in Greece
- Methanol
