= Acid strength =

Measure of the tendency of an acid to dissociate

Acid strength is the tendency of an acid, symbolised by the chemical formula HA, to dissociate into a proton, H^{+}, and an anion, A^{−}. The dissociation or ionization of a strong acid in solution is effectively complete, except in its most concentrated solutions.

HA → H^{+} + A^{−}

Examples of strong acids are hydrochloric acid (HCl), perchloric acid (HClO_{4}), nitric acid (HNO_{3}) and sulfuric acid (H_{2}SO_{4}).

A weak acid is only partially dissociated, or is partly ionized in water with both the undissociated acid and its dissociation products being present, in solution, in equilibrium with each other.

HA ⇌ H^{+} + A^{−}

Acetic acid (CH_{3}COOH) is an example of a weak acid. The strength of a weak acid is quantified by its acid dissociation constant, $K_a$ value.

The strength of a weak organic acid may depend on substituent effects. The strength of an inorganic acid is dependent on the oxidation state for the atom to which the proton may be attached. Acid strength is solvent-dependent. For example, hydrogen chloride is a strong acid in aqueous solution, but is a weak acid when dissolved in glacial acetic acid.

== Measures of acid strength ==
The usual measure of the strength of an acid is its acid dissociation constant ($K_a$), which can be determined experimentally by titration methods. Stronger acids have a larger $K_a$ and a smaller logarithmic constant ($\mathrm{p}K_a = - \log K_a$) than weaker acids. The stronger an acid is, the more easily it loses a proton, H^{+}. Two key factors that contribute to the ease of deprotonation are the polarity of the H−A bond and the size of atom A, which determine the strength of the H−A bond. Acid strengths also depend on the stability of the conjugate base.

While the $K_a$ value measures the tendency of an acidic solute to transfer a proton to a standard solvent (most commonly water or DMSO), the tendency of an acidic solvent to transfer a proton to a reference solute (most commonly a weak aniline base) is measured by its Hammett acidity function, the $H_0$ value. Although these two concepts of acid strength often amount to the same general tendency of a substance to donate a proton, the $K_a$ and $H_0$ values are measures of distinct properties and may occasionally diverge. For instance, hydrogen fluoride, whether dissolved in water ($\mathrm{p}K_a = 3.2$) or DMSO ($\mathrm{p}K_a = 15$), has $\mathrm{p}K_a$ values indicating that it undergoes incomplete dissociation in these solvents, making it a weak acid. However, as the rigorously dried, neat acidic medium, hydrogen fluoride has an $H_0$ value of –15, making it a more strongly protonating medium than 100% sulfuric acid and thus, by definition, a superacid. (To prevent ambiguity, in the rest of this article, "strong acid" will, unless otherwise stated, refer to an acid that is strong as measured by its $\mathrm{p}K_\ce{a}$ value ($\mathrm{p}K_\ce{a} < -1.74$). This usage is consistent with the common parlance of most practicing chemists.)

When the acidic medium in question is a dilute aqueous solution, the $H_0$ is approximately equal to the pH value, which is a negative logarithm of the concentration of aqueous H^{+} in solution. The pH of a simple solution of an acid in water is determined by both $K_a$ and the acid concentration. For weak acid solutions, it depends on the degree of dissociation, which may be determined by an equilibrium calculation. For concentrated solutions of acids, especially strong acids for which pH < 0, the $H_0$ value is a better measure of acidity than the pH.

== Strong acids ==
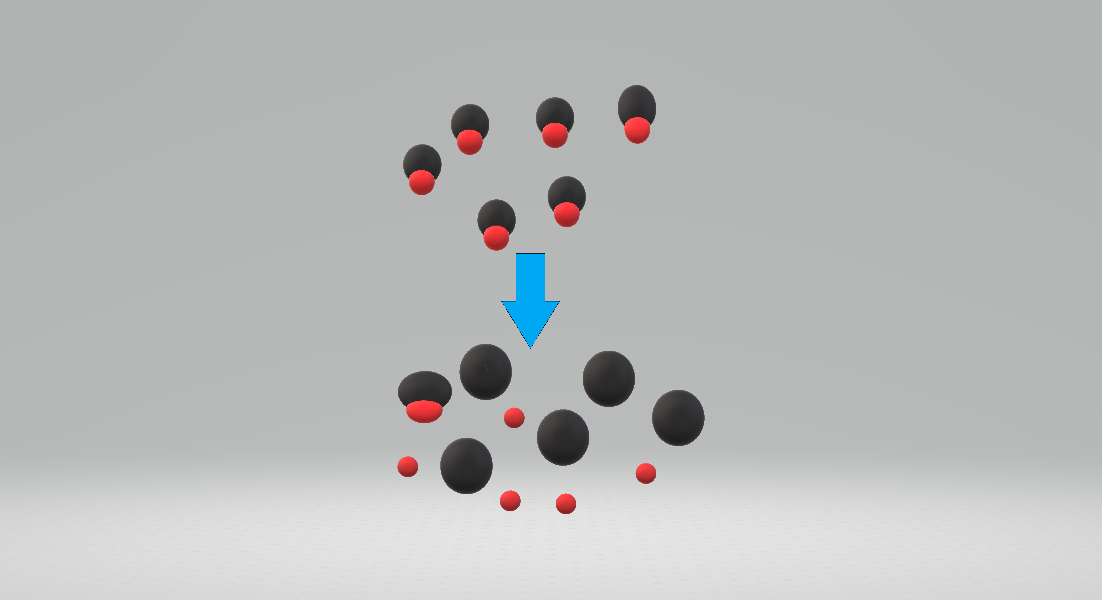
Image of a strong acid mostly dissociating. The small red circles represent H^{+} ions.

A strong acid is an acid that dissociates according to the reaction

HA + S ⇌ SH^{+} + A^{−}

where S represents a solvent molecule, such as a molecule of water or dimethyl sulfoxide (DMSO), to such an extent that the concentration of the undissociated species HA is too low to be measured. For practical purposes a strong acid can be said to be completely dissociated. An example of a strong acid is perchloric acid.

HClO_{4} → H^{+} + ClO^{−}_{4} (in aqueous solution)

Any acid with a $\mathrm{p}K_a$ value which is less than about −2 behaves as a strong acid. This results from the very high buffer capacity of solutions with a pH value of 1 or less and is known as the leveling effect.

The following are strong acids in aqueous and dimethyl sulfoxide solution. As mentioned above, because the dissociation is so strongly favored, the concentrations of HA and thus the values of $\mathrm{p}K_a$ cannot be measured experimentally. The values in the following table are average values from as many as 8 different theoretical calculations.

Estimated pK_{a} values
Acid	Formula	in water	in DMSO
Hydrochloric acid	HCl	−5.9 ± 0.4	−2.0 ± 0.6
Hydrobromic acid	HBr	−8.8 ± 0.8	−6.8 ± 0.8
Hydroiodic acid	HI	−9.5 ± 1	−10.9 ± 1
Triflic acid	H[CF_{3}SO_{3}]	−14 ± 2	−14 ± 2
Perchloric acid	H[ClO_{4}]	−15 ± 2	−15 ± 2

Also, in water

- Nitric acid HNO_{3} $\mathrm{p}K_a = -1.6$
- Sulfuric acid H_{2}SO_{4} (first dissociation only, $\mathrm{p}K_{a1} \approx -3$)

The following can be used as protonators in organic chemistry

- Fluoroantimonic acid H[SbF_{6}]
- Magic acid H[FSO_{3}SbF_{5}]
- Carborane superacid H[CHB_{11}Cl_{11}]
- Fluorosulfuric acid H[FSO_{3}] ($\mathrm{p}K_a = -6.4$)

Sulfonic acids, such as p-toluenesulfonic acid (tosylic acid) are a class of strong organic oxyacids. Some sulfonic acids can be isolated as solids. Polystyrene functionalized into polystyrene sulfonate is an example of a substance that is a solid strong acid.

== Weak acids ==
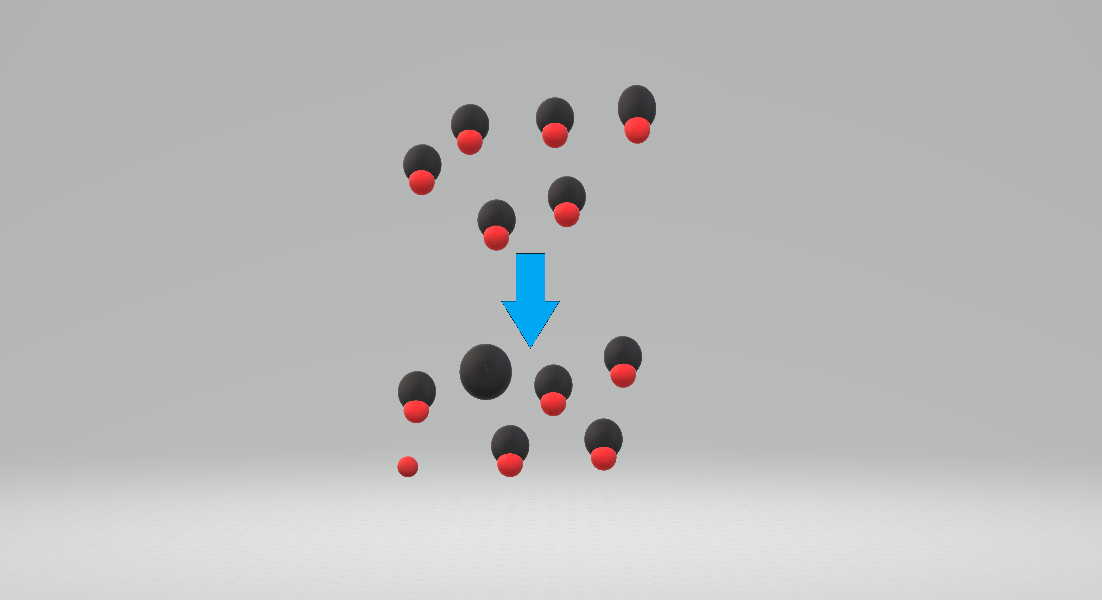
Image of a weak acid partly dissociating

A weak acid is a substance that partially dissociates or partly ionizes when it is dissolved in a solvent. In solution, there is an equilibrium between the acid, HA, and the products of dissociation.

HA ⇌ H^{+} + A^{−}

The solvent (e.g. water) is omitted from this expression when its concentration is effectively unchanged by the process of acid dissociation. The strength of a weak acid can be quantified in terms of a dissociation constant, $K_a$, defined as follows, where $\ce{[X]}$ signifies the concentration of a chemical moiety, X.
$$K_a = \frac{[\mathrm{H}^+][\mathrm{A}^-]}{[\mathrm{HA}]}$$
When a numerical value of $K_a$ is known it can be used to determine the extent of dissociation in a solution with a given concentration of the acid, $T_H$, by applying the law of conservation of mass.
$$\begin{align}T_H &=[\mathrm{H}^+]+[\mathrm{HA}]\\
&=[\mathrm{H}^+]+\frac{[\mathrm{A}^-][\mathrm{H}^+]}{K_a}\\
&=[\mathrm{H}^+]+\frac{[\mathrm{H}^+]^2}{K_a} \end{align}$$
where $T_H$ is the value of the analytical concentration of the acid. When all the quantities in this equation are treated as numbers, ionic charges are not shown and this becomes a quadratic equation in the value of the hydrogen ion concentration value, [H^{+}].
$$\frac{[\mathrm{H}^+]^2}{K_a} + [\mathrm{H}^+] - T_H = 0$$
This equation shows that the pH of a solution of a weak acid depends on both its $K_a$ value and its concentration. Typical examples of weak acids include acetic acid and phosphorous acid. An acid such as oxalic acid (HOOC−COOH) is said to be dibasic because it can lose two protons and react with two molecules of a simple base. Phosphoric acid (H_{3}PO_{4}) is tribasic.

For a more rigorous treatment of acid strength see acid dissociation constant. This includes acids such as the dibasic acid succinic acid, for which the simple method of calculating the pH of a solution, shown above, cannot be used.

=== Experimental determination ===
The experimental determination of a $\mathrm{p}K_a$ value is commonly performed by means of a titration. A typical procedure would be as follows. A quantity of strong acid is added to a solution containing the acid or a salt of the acid, to the point where the compound is fully protonated. The solution is then titrated with a strong base

HA + OH^{−} → A^{−} + H_{2}O

until only the deprotonated species, A^{−}, remains in solution. At each point in the titration pH is measured using a glass electrode and a pH meter. The equilibrium constant is found by fitting calculated pH values to the observed values, using the method of least squares.

=== Conjugate acid/base pair ===
It is sometimes stated that "the conjugate of a weak acid is a strong base". Such a statement is incorrect. For example, acetic acid is a weak acid which has a $K_a = 1.75 \times 10^{-5}$. Its conjugate base is the acetate ion with $K_b = 10^{-14}$ and $K_a = 5.7 \times 10^{-10}$ (from the relationship $K_a \times K_b = 10^{-14}$), which certainly does not correspond to a strong base. The conjugate of a weak acid is often a weak base and vice versa.

== Acids in non-aqueous solvents ==
The strength of an acid varies from solvent to solvent. An acid which is strong in water may be weak in a less basic solvent, and an acid which is weak in water may be strong in a more basic solvent. According to Brønsted–Lowry acid–base theory, the solvent S can accept a proton.

HA + S ⇌ A^{−} + HS^{+}

For example, hydrochloric acid is a weak acid in solution in pure acetic acid, HO_{2}CCH_{3}, which is less basic than water.

HO_{2}CCH_{3} + HCl ⇌ (HO)_{2}CCH^{+}_{3} + Cl^{−}

The extent of ionization of the hydrohalic acids decreases in the order HI > HBr > HCl. Acetic acid is said to be a differentiating solvent for the three acids, while water is not.

An important example of a solvent which is more basic than water is dimethyl sulfoxide, DMSO, (CH_{3})_{2}SO. A compound which is a weak acid in water may become a strong acid in DMSO. Acetic acid is an example of such a substance. An extensive bibliography of $\mathrm{p}K_a$ values in solution in DMSO and other solvents can be found at Acidity–Basicity Data in Nonaqueous Solvents.

Superacids are strong acids even in solvents of low dielectric constant. Examples of superacids are fluoroantimonic acid and magic acid. Some superacids can be crystallised. They can also quantitatively stabilize carbocations.

Lewis acids reacting with Lewis bases in gas phase and non-aqueous solvents have been classified in the ECW model, and it has been shown that there is no one order of acid strengths. The relative acceptor strength of Lewis acids toward a series of bases, versus other Lewis acids, can be illustrated by C-B plots. It has been shown that to define the order of Lewis acid strength at least two properties must be considered. For the qualitative HSAB theory the two properties are hardness and strength while for the quantitative ECW model the two properties are electrostatic and covalent.

== Factors determining acid strength ==
=== The inductive effect ===
In organic carboxylic acids, an electronegative substituent can pull electron density out of an acidic bond through the inductive effect, resulting in a smaller $\mathrm{p}K_a$ value. The effect decreases, the further the electronegative element is from the carboxylate group, as illustrated by the following series of halogenated butanoic acids.

Structure	Name	pK_{a}
	2-chlorobutanoic acid	2.86
	3-chlorobutanoic acid	4.0
	4-chlorobutanoic acid	4.5
	butanoic acid	4.5

=== Effect of oxidation state ===
In a set of oxoacids of an element, $\mathrm{p}K_a$ values decrease with the oxidation state of the element. The oxoacids of chlorine illustrate this trend.

Structure	Name	Oxidation state	pK_{a}
	perchloric acid	7	−8^{†}
	chloric acid	5	−1
	chlorous acid	3	2.0
	hypochlorous acid	1	7.53

† theoretical
