= Leveling effect =

Effect of solvents on properties of acids and bases

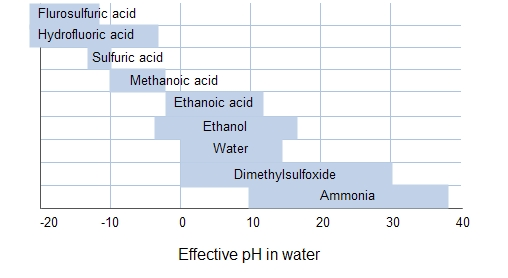
Acid-base discrimination windows of common solvents

Leveling effect or solvent leveling refers to the effect of solvent on the properties of acids and bases. The strength of a strong acid is limited ("leveled") by the basicity of the solvent. Similarly the strength of a strong base is leveled by the acidity of the solvent. When a strong acid is dissolved in water, it reacts with it to form hydronium ion (H_{3}O^{+}). An example of this would be the following reaction, where "HA" is the strong acid:

HA + H_{2}O → A^{−} + H_{3}O^{+}

Any acid that is stronger than H_{3}O^{+} reacts with H_{2}O to form H_{3}O^{+}. Therefore, no acid stronger than H_{3}O^{+} exists in H_{2}O. For example, aqueous perchloric acid (HClO_{4}), aqueous hydrochloric acid (HCl) and aqueous nitric acid (HNO_{3}) are all completely ionized, and are all equally strong acids.

Similarly, when ammonia is the solvent, the strongest acid is ammonium (NH_{4}^{+}), thus HCl and a super acid exert the same acidifying effect.

The same argument applies to bases. In water, OH^{−} is the strongest base. Thus, even though sodium amide (NaNH_{2}) is an exceptional base (pK_{a} of NH_{3} ~ 33), in water it is only as good as sodium hydroxide. On the other hand, NaNH_{2} is a far more basic reagent in ammonia than is NaOH.

The pH range allowed by a particular solvent is called the acid-base discrimination window.

== Leveling and differentiating solvents ==
Strong bases are leveling solvents for acids, weak bases are differentiating solvents for acids. In a leveling solvent, many acids are completely dissociated and are thus of the same strength. All acids tend to become indistinguishable in strength when dissolved in strongly basic solvents owing to the greater affinity of strong bases for protons. This is called the leveling effect.

In a differentiating solvent on the other hand, various acids dissociate to different degrees and thus have different strengths. For example, anhydrous acetic acid (CH_{3}COOH) as solvent is a weaker proton acceptor than water. Strong aqueous acids such as hydrochloric acid and perchloric acid are only partly dissociated in anhydrous acetic acid and their strengths are unequal; in fact perchloric acid is about 5000 times stronger than hydrochloric acid in this solvent. A weakly basic solvent such as acetic acid has less tendency than a more strongly basic one such as water to accept a proton. Similarly a weakly acidic solvent has less tendency to donate protons than a strong acid.

Because of the leveling effect of common solvents, studies on super acids are conducted in more differentiating solvents that are very weakly basic such as sulfur dioxide (liquefied) and SO_{2}ClF.

== Types of solvent on the basis of proton interaction ==
On the basis of proton interaction, solvents are of four types,

(i) Protophilic solvents: Solvents which have greater tendency to accept protons, i.e., water, alcohol, liquid ammonia, etc.

(ii) Protogenic solvents: Solvents which have the tendency to produce protons, i.e., water, liquid hydrogen chloride, glacial acetic acid, etc.

(iii) Amphiprotic solvents: Solvents which act both as protophilic or protogenic, e.g., water, liquid ammonia, ethyl alcohol, etc.

(iv) Aprotic solvents: Solvents which neither donate nor accept protons, e.g., benzene, carbon tetrachloride, carbon disulfide, etc.

HCl acts as a strong acid in H_{2}O, an even stronger acid in NH_{3}, a weak acid in CH_{3}COOH, neutral in C_{6}H_{6} and a weak base in HF. NaHSO_{3} acts as a weak acid in DMSO, a strong acid in NH_{3}, a weak base in glacial acetic acid, and a strong base in sulfuric acid.
