= Diethynylbenzene dianion =

Group of isomeric chemical compounds which are strong bases

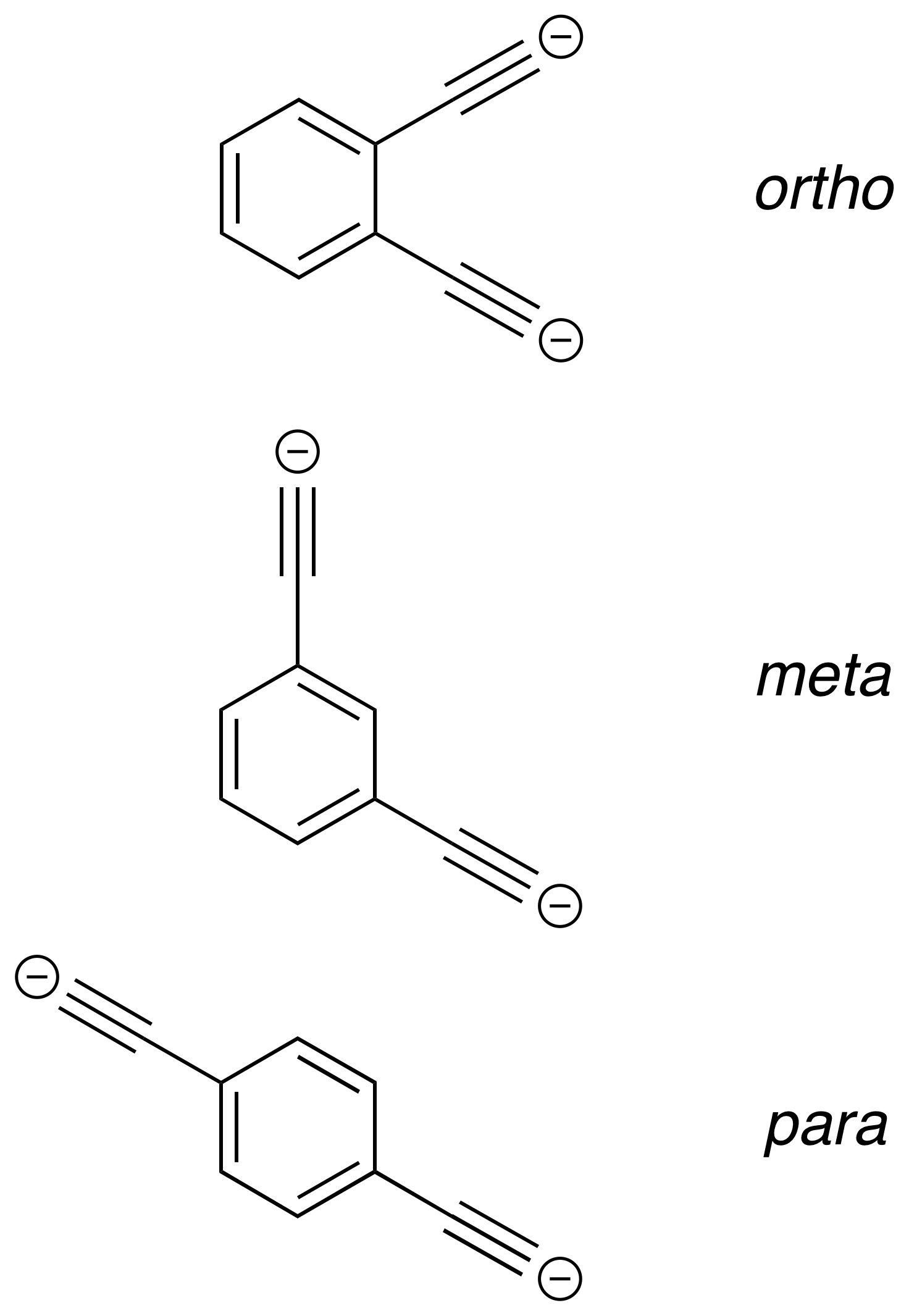

Identifiers
3D model (JSmol)	(ortho): Interactive image; (meta): Interactive image; (para): Interactive image
- InChI: (para): InChI=1S/C10H4/c1-3-9-5-7-10(4-2)8-6-9/h5-8H/q-2 Key: GGQMWKMAMDPRPA-UHFFFAOYSA-N
- SMILES: (ortho): [C-]#Cc0ccccc0C#[C-]; (meta): [C-]#Cc0cccc(c0)C#[C-]; (para): [C-]#Cc1ccc(cc1)C#[C-]

Properties
Chemical formula	C_{10}H_{4}^{2−}
Molar mass	124.143 g·mol^{−1}
- Except where otherwise noted, data are given for materials in their standard state (at 25 °C [77 °F], 100 kPa). Infobox references

In organic chemistry, a diethynylbenzene dianion is an anion consisting of two ethynyl anions as substituents on a benzene ring. With the chemical formula C_{6}H_{4}C^{2−}_{4}, three positional isomers are possible, differing in the relative positions of the two substituents around the ring:

- ortho-diethynylbenzene dianion
- meta-diethynylbenzene dianion
- para-diethynylbenzene dianion

The gaseous state of all three anions are of theoretical interest. They have been generated by decarboxylation of benzene dipropynoic acids, using the technique of mass spectrometry. The three isomers of the dianion are the three strongest known superbases ever, with the ortho isomer being the strongest, with a proton affinity of 1,843.987 kJ/mol (440.723 kcal/mol). The meta isomer is the second-strongest, and the para isomer is the third-strongest.

== Observation ==
These dianions were generated in a linear quadrupole ion-trap mass spectrometer. Electrospray ionization (ESI) of the diacid precursor results in the dicarboxylate dianion [C_{6}H_{4}(C_{3}O_{2})_{2}]^{2−} by loss of two hydrogen atoms, identified spectrometrically by its mass-to-charge ratio (m/z) of 106. This dianion was mass-selected and then subjected to collision-induced dissociation (CID), resulting in the consecutive loss of two carbon dioxide molecules to form the diethynyl dianion [C_{6}H_{4}(C_{2})_{2}]^{2−} at m/z = 62. For the ortho isomer, the reaction process is as follows, with the other isomers following an analogous process depending on the isomer of the original diacid:

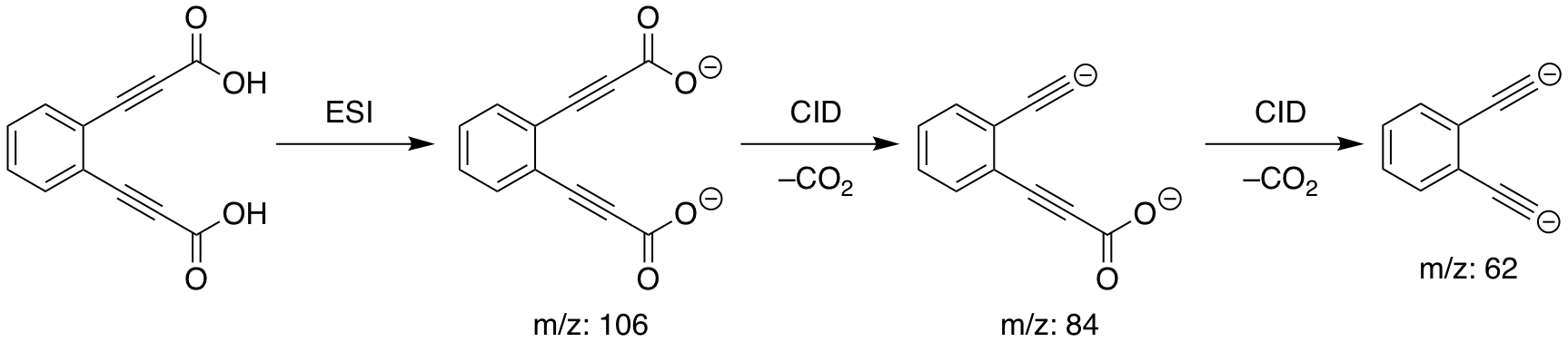
Preparation of o-diethynylbenzene dianion from the o-dipropynoic acid precursor

== Reactions ==
Reactions of the gas-phase dianions were studied by reacting with a small quantity of various reagents added to the helium carrier gas in the spectrometer. For example, reaction with deuterium oxide (heavy water) produced the singly-deuterated monoanion C_{6}H_{4}(C_{2}D)(C^{−}_{2}) identified as m/z = 126. Reaction with benzene produced the phenyl anion (m/z = 77) highlighting the extreme basicity of the dianion. Attempted reaction with deuterium gas and deuterated methane was not successful despite the favourable thermodynamics; the authors attribute this to the high activation barrier for proton abstraction from those substrates.

=== Basicity ===
All three isomers are superbasic. According to calculations, ortho-diethynylbenzene dianion is the strongest superbase and has a proton affinity of 1,843.987 kJ/mol (440.723 kcal/mol). The meta isomer is the second-strongest, and the para isomer is the third. All three are readily able to accept any proton to its ethynyl tails, from almost any compound. All three isomers function as superbases better than helonium does as a superacid.

== See also ==
- Lithium monoxide anion
