= Superbase =

Extremely strong base

A superbase is a compound that has a particularly high affinity for protons. Superbases are of theoretical interest and potentially valuable in organic synthesis. Superbases have been described and used since the 1850s.

== Definitions ==
Generically IUPAC defines a superbase as a "compound having a very high basicity, such as lithium diisopropylamide." Superbases are often defined in two broad categories, organic and organometallic.

Organic superbases are charge-neutral compounds with basicities greater than that of proton sponge (1,8-bis(dimethylamino)naphthalene, pK_{BH^{+}} = 18.6 in acetonitrile). In a related definition: any species with a higher absolute proton affinity (APA = 245.3 kcal/mol) and intrinsic gas phase basicity (GB = 239 kcal/mol) than proton sponge. Common superbases of this variety feature amidine, guanidine, and phosphazene functional groups. Strong superbases can be designed by utilizing various approaches to stabilize the conjugate acid, up to the theoretical limits of basicity.

Organometallic superbases, sometimes called Lochmann–Schlosser superbases, result from the combination of alkali metal alkoxides and organolithium reagents. Caubère defines superbases as "bases resulting from a mixing of two (or more) bases leading to new basic species possessing inherent new properties. The term superbase does not mean a base is thermodynamically and/or kinetically stronger than another, instead it means that a basic reagent is created by combining the characteristics of several different bases."

=== Organic superbases ===
Protonation of Verkade base. Its conjugate acid has a pK_{a} of 32.9 in acetonitrile.

Organic superbases are mostly charge-neutral, nitrogen containing species, where nitrogen act as a proton acceptor. These include the phosphazenes, phosphanes, amidines, and guanidines. Other organic compounds that meet the physicochemical or structural definitions of 'superbase' include proton chelators like the aromatic proton sponges and the bispidines. Multicyclic polyamines, like DABCO might also be loosely included in this category. Phosphanes and carbodiphosphoranes are also strong organosuperbases.

Despite enormous proton affinity, many organosuperbases can exhibit low nucleophilicity.

Superbases are used in organocatalysis.

=== Organometallic ===
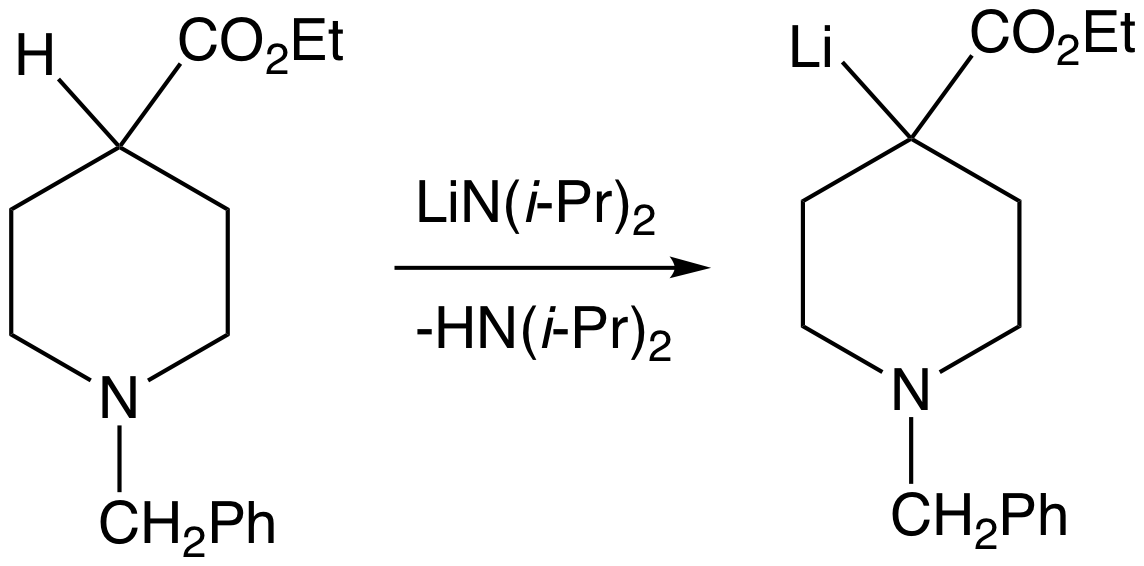
Deprotonation using LDA.

Organometallic compounds of electropositive metals are superbases, but they are generally strong nucleophiles. Examples include organolithium and organomagnesium (Grignard reagent) compounds. Another type of organometallic superbase has a reactive metal exchanged for a hydrogen on a heteroatom, such as oxygen (unstabilized alkoxides) or nitrogen (metal amides such as lithium diisopropylamide).

The Schlosser base (or Lochmann-Schlosser base), the combination of n-butyllithium and potassium tert-butoxide, is commonly cited as a superbase. n-Butyllithium and potassium tert-butoxide form a mixed aggregate of greater reactivity than either component reagent.

=== Inorganic ===
Inorganic superbases are typically salt-like compounds with small, highly charged anions, e.g., lithium hydride, potassium hydride, and sodium hydride. Such species are insoluble, but the surfaces of these materials are highly reactive and slurries are useful in synthesis. Caesium oxide is probably the strongest base according to quantum-chemical calculations.

== See also ==
- Superacid
- Phosphazene
