= Lanthanum triflate =

Names
- IUPAC name Lanthanum(III) trifluoromethanesulfonate
- Other names: La(OTf)_{3}; Lanthanum tris(trifluoromethanesulfonate); Tris(trifluoromethanesulfonato)lanthanum; Lanthanum(III) triflate; Trifluoromethanesulfonic acid lanthanum salt

Identifiers
CAS Number	52093-26-2
3D model (JSmol)	Interactive image; nonahydrate: Interactive image
ChemSpider	2015701
ECHA InfoCard	100.156.917
EC Number	628-666-3
PubChem CID	2733938; nonahydrate: 129773111
CompTox Dashboard (EPA)	DTXSID10370049
- InChI: InChI=1S/3CHF3O3S.La/c3*2-1(3,4)8(5,6)7;/h3*(H,5,6,7);/q;;;+3/p-3 Key: WGJJZRVGLPOKQT-UHFFFAOYSA-K; nonahydrate: InChI=1S/3CHF3O3S.La.9H2O/c3*2-1(3,4)8(5,6)7;;;;;;;;;;/h3*(H,5,6,7);;9*1H2/q;;;+3;;;;;;;;;/p-3 Key: DDAPLPNUENWYHJ-UHFFFAOYSA-K
- SMILES: [La+3].[O-]S(=O)(=O)C(F)(F)F.[O-]S(=O)(=O)C(F)(F)F.[O-]S(=O)(=O)C(F)(F)F; nonahydrate: C(F)(F)(F)S(=O)(=O)[O-].C(F)(F)(F)S(=O)(=O)[O-].C(F)(F)(F)S(=O)(=O)[O-].O.O.O.O.O.O.O.O.O.[La+3]

Properties
Chemical formula	CF_{9}LaO_{9}S_{3}
Molar mass	562.07 g·mol^{−1}
Appearance	white to gray–white solid
Density	1.7 g/cm^{3}
Melting point	300 °C (572 °F; 573 K)
Solubility in water	soluble

Hazards
- GHS labelling
Pictograms	(GHS05: Corrosive)
Signal word	Danger
Hazard statements	H314
Precautionary statements	P260, P280, P301+P330+P331, P303+P361+P353, P304+P340+P310, P305+P351+P338+P310
- Except where otherwise noted, data are given for materials in their standard state (at 25 °C [77 °F], 100 kPa). Infobox references

Lanthanum triflate is a complex inorganic compound of lanthanum, fluorine, carbon, sulphur, and oxygen with the chemical formula (CF_{3}SO_{3})_{3}La. This is the lanthanum salt of trifluoromethanesulphonic acid.

== Synthesis ==
Lanthanum triflate is typically synthesized by reacting lanthanum oxide with 50% aqueous trifluoromethanesulfonic acid under heating.

La_{2}O_{3} + 6HOTf → 2La(OTf)_{3} + 3H_{2}O

== Physical properties ==
The compound forms white to gray-white solid. It is soluble in water; partially soluble in tetrahydrofuran (THF) and dichloromethane; sparingly soluble in diethyl ether; and insoluble in hexane.

Like other lanthanide triflates, lanthanum triflate is a Lewis acid, but unlike other Lewis acids like AlCl_{3}, it is stable in water.

== Uses ==
The compound serves as an efficient standalone catalyst for the direct synthesis of various amides from esters and amines under gentle reaction conditions.
