= Methanesulfonic anhydride =

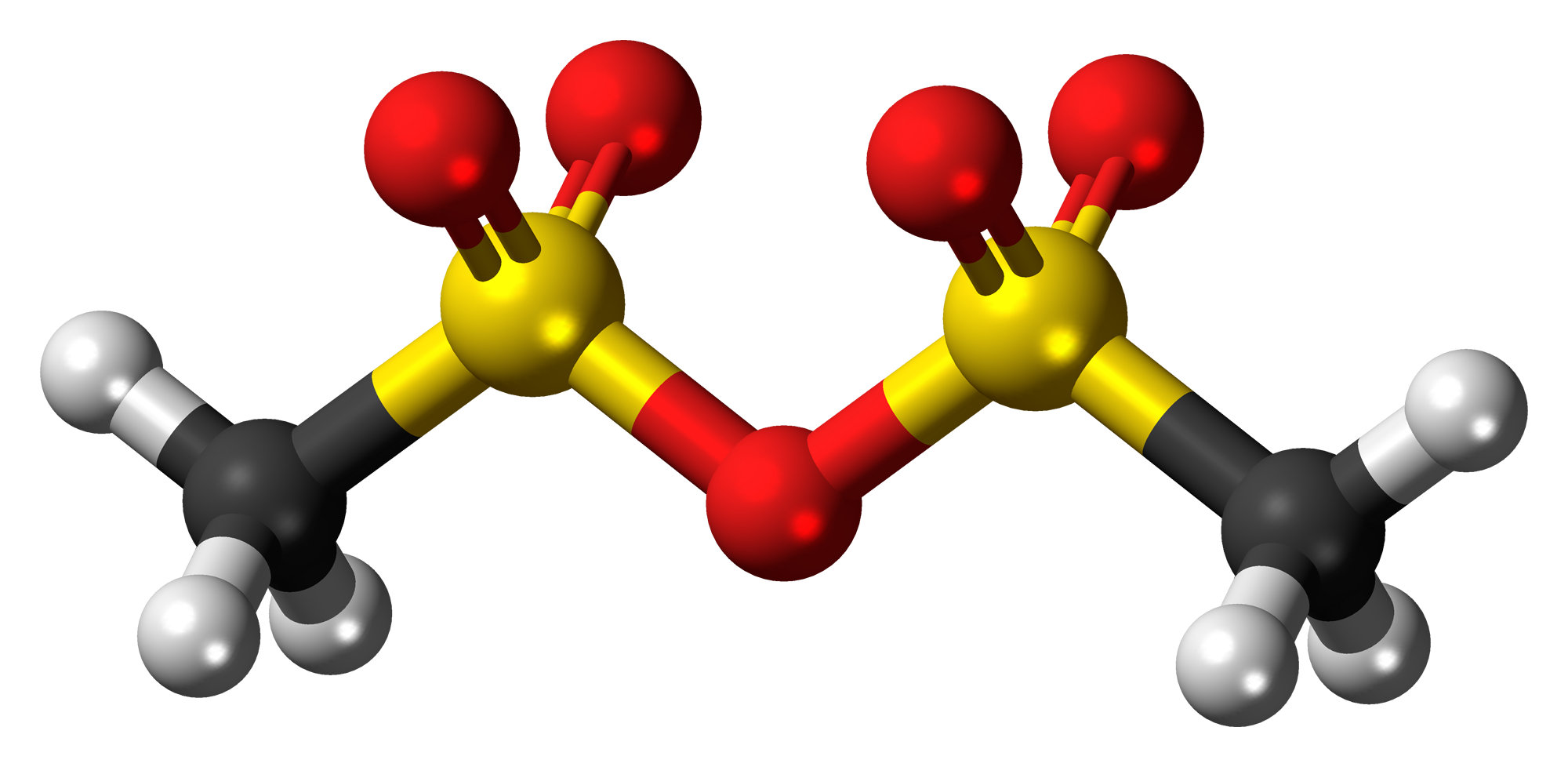

Names
- Preferred IUPAC name Methanesulfonic anhydride
- Other names: mesyl anhydride; methylsulfonyl methanesulfonate; methanesulfonic acid methylsulfonyl ester

Identifiers
CAS Number	7143-01-3
3D model (JSmol)	Interactive image
ChemSpider	73591
ECHA InfoCard	100.027.675
PubChem CID	81560
UNII	J492U7J4PB
CompTox Dashboard (EPA)	DTXSID70864010
- InChI: InChI=1S/C2H6O5S2/c1-8(3,4)7-9(2,5)6/h1-2H3 Key: IZDROVVXIHRYMH-UHFFFAOYSA-N; InChI=1/C2H6O5S2/c1-8(3,4)7-9(2,5)6/h1-2H3 Key: IZDROVVXIHRYMH-UHFFFAOYAS
- SMILES: O=S(=O)(OS(=O)(=O)C)C

Properties
Chemical formula	C_{2}H_{6}O_{5}S_{2}
Molar mass	174.19 g·mol^{−1}
Appearance	White solid
Density	0.92 g/ml
Melting point	69.5–70 °C (157.1–158.0 °F; 342.6–343.1 K)
Solubility in water	Hydrolysis
Solubility	Soluble in most aprotic organic solvents
- Except where otherwise noted, data are given for materials in their standard state (at 25 °C [77 °F], 100 kPa). verify (what is ?) Infobox references

Methanesulfonic anhydride (Ms_{2}O) is the organosulfur compound with the formula (CH_{3}SO_{2})_{2}O. It is the acid anhydride of methanesulfonic acid. Like methanesulfonyl chloride (MsCl), it may be used to generate mesylates (methanesulfonyl esters).

== Preparation ==
Ms_{2}O may be prepared by the dehydration of methanesulfonic acid with phosphorus pentoxide as described by this idealized equation:

P_{2}O_{5} + 6 CH_{3}SO_{3}H → 3 (CH_{3}SO_{2})_{2}O + 2 H_{3}PO_{4}

Ms_{2}O can be purified by vacuum distillation or by recrystallization from methyl tert-butyl ether/toluene.

== Reactions ==
Passage of hydrogen chloride through molten Ms_{2}O yields MsCl.

Similar to MsCl, Ms_{2}O can perform mesylation of alcohols to form sulfonate esters:

(CH_{3}SO_{2})_{2}O + ROH → CH_{3}SO_{3}R + CH_{3}SO_{3}H

Use of Ms_{2}O avoids the alkyl chloride, which can appear as a side-product when MsCl is used. Unlike MsCl, Ms_{2}O may not be suitable for mesylation of the unsaturated alcohols.

Examples of mesylation of alcohols with Ms_{2}O:

- Octadecyl methanesulfonate was prepared from octadecanol in pyridine.
- Secondary alcohol at the anomeric carbon of 2,3,4,5-O-Benzyl-protected glucose reacted to form a glycosyl mesylate, which was found to be more stable than its triflate counterpart, in 2,4,6-collidine.

Ms_{2}O also converts amines to sulfonamides.

=== Aromatic sulfonation ===
Assisted by Lewis acid catalyst, Friedel-Crafts methylsulfonation of aryl ring can be achieved by Ms_{2}O. In contrast to MsCl, either activated or deactivated benzene derivatives can form the corresponding sulfonates in satisfactory yields with Ms_{2}O.

Examples of aromatic sulfonation with Ms_{2}O:

- Sulfonation of chlorobenzene resulted in addition of methylsulfonyl group at para and ortho positions (with respect to chloride), with a ratio of 2 to 1, respectively; while reaction with Meta-dichlorobenzene gave monosulfonylated product at C4 position.
- With sulfuric acid, di-aryl sulfones were synthesized.

=== Esterification ===
Ms_{2}O catalyzes the esterification of alcohols by carboxylic acids. 2-Naphthyl acetate was prepared from 2-naphthol and glacial (anhydrous) acetic acid in the presence of Ms_{2}O. Ethylene glycol undergoes double benzoylation by benzoic acid in the presence of Ms_{2}O. Monosaccharides do not, however, undergo full acetylation using Ms_{2}O.

=== Oxidation of alcohols ===
Like Pfitzner–Moffatt oxidation and Swern oxidation, with DMSO, Ms_{2}O can oxidize primary and secondary alcohols to aldehydes and ketones, respectively, in HMPA. This method applies to benzylic alcohol. HMPA may be substituted by dichloromethane but may result in more side-products.

== See also ==
- Methanesulfonyl chloride
- Disulfuric acid
- Sodium pyrosulfate
- Acetic anhydride
- Trifluoromethanesulfonic anhydride
