= Zinc-ion battery =

Battery that uses zinc ions as the charge carriers

A zinc-ion battery or Zn-ion battery (abbreviated as ZIB) uses zinc ions (Zn^{2+}) as the charge carriers. Specifically, ZIBs utilize Zn metal as the anode, Zn-intercalating materials as the cathode, and a Zn-containing electrolyte. Generally, the term zinc-ion battery is reserved for rechargeable (secondary) batteries, which are sometimes also referred to as rechargeable zinc metal batteries (RZMB). Thus, ZIBs are different than non-rechargeable (primary) batteries which use zinc, such as alkaline or zinc–carbon batteries.

== History ==
In 2011, Feiyu Kang's group showcased for the first time the reversible Zn-ion insertion into the tunnel structure of alpha-type manganese dioxide (MnO_{2}) host used as the cathode in a ZIB.

The University of Waterloo in Canada owns patent rights to zinc-ion battery technology developed in its laboratories. The Canadian company Salient Energy is commercialising the zinc-ion battery technology.

Other forms of rechargeable zinc batteries are also being developed for stationary energy storage, although these are not explicitly zinc-ion. For example, Eos Energy Storage is developing a zinc-halide battery in which the cathode reaction involves the oxidation and reduction of halides. Eos Energy Storage is producing 1.5GWh of 'Made in America' zinc batteries to be used in the Texas and California electric grids.

== Research ==
=== Motivation ===
ZIBs are an alternative to lithium-ion batteries for grid-scale energy storage because of their affordability, safety, and compatibility with aqueous electrolytes. Research challenges at the anode, electrolyte, and cathode currently prevent its further commercialization.

=== Anodes ===
A zinc metal negative electrode holds a high theoretical volumetric capacity (5854 Ah L^{−1}), gravimetric capacity (820 Ah kg^{−1}), and natural abundance. Zinc production and proven reserves exist at a higher scale than lithium metal due to zinc's use in galvanization and its broad geographic availability. Other benefits of zinc metal as an anode material include its compatibility with both aqueous and non-aqueous electrolytes and its higher safety and lower environmental toxicity compared to lithium.

Challenges to the Zn metal anode in the typical near-neutral aqueous electrolyte include the hydrogen evolution reaction and anode corrosion, which can cause capacity loss. Dendrite growth also occurs on Zn metal, like on Li metal, due to uneven plating. While these dendrites can cause capacity loss and cell short-circuit, they do not cause the explosion and fire risk of lithium metal batteries due to the aqueous electrolytes. Current research strategies to address these challenges include anode capping layers and structural and chemical changes to the Zn metal.

=== Electrolytes ===
Aqueous electrolytes are the dominant form in ZIBs due to their high conductivity, low price, non-flammability, and environmental safety. Typical Zn salts are ZnSO_{4}, Zn(OTf)_{2}, and Zn(TFSI)_{2}. Zinc sulfate is widely used today because of its lower cost and electrode stability, but the larger triflate and TFSI anions can lead to higher conductivities. Despite the advantages of aqueous electrolytes, the hydrogen evolution reaction and facile dendrite growth limit their use. Electrolyte additives such as buffering agents or other zinc salts can improve the performance of the aqueous electrolyte, as can the use of superconcentrated electrolytes, by altering the zinc solvation structure.

Non-aqueous electrolytes are another area of current research that uses organic liquid or ionic liquid electrolytes to prevent the hydrogen evolution reaction. Despite the lower conductivities and higher costs of these electrolytes, they can have higher voltage stability windows than water (1.7V) as well as higher coulombic efficiencies and cycle lifetimes due to an absence of the hydrogen evolution reaction. Current research includes methods to increase the conductivity and lower the charge transfer resistance of these electrolytes.

Recently, an approach that introduces a non-aqueous organic solvent as a cosolvent into an aqueous electrolyte has been widely studied. This approach retains the advantages of aqueous electrolytes (e.g., safety, high ionic conductivity, and environmental benignity) while simultaneously suppressing side reactions associated with water. Notably, both hydrophilic and hydrophobic organic solvents, such as dimethyl sulfoxide (DMSO), propylene carbonate (PC), and diethyl carbonate (DEC), have been explored. Studies have demonstrated that this strategy enhances the electrochemical stability and performance of aqueous zinc batteries.

=== Cathodes ===
Manganese and Vanadium oxides are the most popular cathode materials for ZIBs due to their stability and theoretical capacity. MnO_{2} cathodes come in multiple phases with different intercalation geometries and specific capacities, the most studied of which are the alpha-, gamma-, and delta-types. In addition to these two materials, Prussian blue analogues, spinel-structured oxides, hexacyanoferrates, and organic materials are also being explored as cathode materials. Additional research is needed to confirm the exact reaction mechanisms and electrolyte-cathode relationship in ZIBs.

=== Flexible Zinc-ion Batteries ===
Zinc-ion battery chemistries have the potential to penetrate into the flexible electronic markets, where demand for flexible energy storage devices has been increasing. Flexible batteries must be safe and ultra-thin, and zinc-ion chemistries provide much safer alternatives to similarly energy-dense batteries like lithium-ion batteries. Current research has shown that flexible zinc-ion batteries (FZIBs) with hydrogel electrolytes show outstanding performance and stretching and bending characteristics. For one cell, discharge curves for different bending radii of the cell align with the curve for the original flat state with only a minor loss in capacity, showing that the cell works well even when deformed. It has even been found that a FZIB could be run-over with a car and still retain discharge capacities similar to the initial state.

However, future work must be done to bring FZIB technology from the lab to real-world applications, especially in terms of finding appropriate electrolytes and suitable compatible electrodes. Promising flexible electrolytes are hydrogels, which have high ionic conductivity and good flexibility, but are sensitive to the environment because of their fragile nature.

== Supply Chain ==
=== Environmental Impact ===
One significant benefit of aqueous zinc-ion batteries (AZIBs) is their lower environmental impacts compared to other battery chemistries like lithium-ion (LIB) or sodium-ion (NIB) batteries. The chemistry of AZIBs means they can be assembled under ambient conditions without a controlled inert, oxygen and moisture-free environment like LIBs or NIBs, which has less of an environmental impact. In addition, the aqueous electrolytes used in AZIBs are better for human health and the environment compared to the organic, often toxic, electrolytes used in LIBs. In a life cycle assessment study done on six different AZIB battery chemistries, the global warming indicator ranged from 22.1 to 95.2 kg CO_{2} equivalent. Compared to the median of 120 kg CO_{2} equivalent for LIBs, AZIBs are equal to or better than LIBs in terms of their emissions.

Currently, the AZIB's cathode, separator and anode are the main drivers of its global warming potential. The cathode is often produced in a multistage fabrication process and requires energy-demanding materials like nickel or tetrahydrofuran. The separator contributes a significant amount to the global warming potential because it must be mechanically robust to protect against dendrite formation, meaning a significant amount of glass microfiber must be used, which carries a relatively large embedded energy.

There are many avenues of research being pursued that can further improve the environmental impact of the AZIBs. Currently, the lower volumetric energy density of AZIBs compared to lithium-oxygen or lithium-sulfur batteries requires the use of larger AZIB cells to store the same amount of energy. Creating cathodes that can operate at higher voltages with higher mass loadings will shrink the required cell size, reducing material use and improving the environmental footprint. In addition, fixing the capacity fade encountered by these batteries over time will lengthen the lifespan of the batteries and reduce their cradle-to-grave impacts. Lastly, research is being conducted on the use of renewable materials as electrolytes and separators, particularly polysaccharides and its derivatives which can create hydrogels with adequate mechanical properties and good electrochemical performance.

=== Recycling ===
The recycling process for ZIBs is currently in its infant stages. Some studies have shown that metallic zinc can be recovered from the batteries with over 99% efficiency through evaporation and separation, and this material can be recycled indefinitely without changes in its physical properties. While the separator will pose a larger challenge for recycling, the use of biopolymer electrolytes allows for environmentally friendly recycling approaches. If organic electroactive materials (OEMs) are used, they demonstrate high solubility in inexpensive organic solvents and are stable in both their charged and discharged states. This allows for OEM AZIBs to be recycled at any state of charge with a high recovery potential.

== See also ==
- List of battery types
