= Stibinidene =

Class of organoantimony compounds

General structure of singlet and triplet stibinidenes

Stibinidenes are a class of organoantimony compounds in which the antimony center exhibits a formal oxidation state of +1. The parent stibinidenes have the formula R–Sb, with the antimony center possessing two lone pairs of electrons and a vacant 5p orbital (Figure 1). Reflecting their unusual low coordination number (i.e., 1) at antimony, stibinidines cannot be isolated. Instead, their oligomers or their adducts are often robust.

== Synthesis ==
Most stibidenes exist as rings or polymers, such as [(C_{6}H_{5})Sb]_{6}

Attempted synthesis of stibinidenes, like carbenes, gives cyclic oligomeric forms. 6-, 5-, 4-, and 3-membered rings have been characterized. They are orange solids. These species exist in equilibrium:

5 (ArSb)_{6} ⇌ 6 (ArSb)_{5}
4(ArSb)_{5} ⇌ 5 (ArSb)_{4}

Distibinidenes, in principle, can be produced by reduction of the corresponding dichlorides. The following idealized equations apply:.

RSbCl_{2} + Mg → RSb + MgCl_{2}

2,4,6-Tris[bis(trimethylsilyl)methyl]phenyl, 2,6-bis-[bis(trimethylsilyl)methyl]-4-[tris(trimethylsilyl)methyl]phenyl, and various m-terphenyl ligands, exist as dimers with the formula RSb=SbR.

2 RSb → RSb=SbR
RSb=SbR + RSb → (RSb)_{3}

When R is bulky, the product "RSb" is obtained as ring with Sb-Sb bonds. Larger substituents give smaller rings, otherwise 5- and 6-membered rings form. In some cases, a dimer with an Sb=Sb bond is isolated.

=== Base-stabilized stibinidene ===
Monomeric stibinidenes were first obtained by Dostál reported a Sb(I) center stabilized by an N,C,N-pincer ligand. The ligand employed was L = 2,6-bis[N-(2',6'-dimethylphenyl)ketimino]phenyl. The synthesis of this complex was achieved by reducing LSb(III)Cl_{2} with two equivalents of t K[B(iBu)_{3}H], resulting in the formation of isolable crystals of the stable monomeric stibinidene [C_{6}H_{3}-2,6-(C(Me)=N-2',6'-Me_{2}C_{6}H_{3})_{2}]Sb via dihydrogen elimination (Scheme 2). In this system, coordination from the nitrogen centers provides thermodynamic stabilization to the Sb(I) center by delocalizing electron density, while the bulky N,C,N ligand introduces significant steric hindrance, which kinetically stabilizes the monomeric stibinidene by preventing dimerization or further reactions. Subsequently, other N,C,N-coordinating ligands were developed to produce stibinidenes, such as ArSb (where Ar = C_{6}H_{3}-2,6-(CH=N^{t}Bu)_{2} & Ar = C_{6}H_{3}-2,6-(CH=NDipp)_{2}) which gained prominence in studies on stibinidene reactivity.

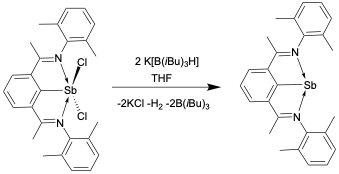
Scheme 2: Synthesis of Dostál's stibiinidene, the most common example of an N,C,N-coordinated stibinidene.

=== Carbene stabilized stibinidene ===
Diamidocarbene (DAC) stabilize monomeric stibinidenes. The synthesis involved the reaction of phenylantimony dichloride, stabilized by a DAC, with magnesium powder in THF (Scheme 3). This process yielded stable, isolable, fluorescent red crystals of the carbene-stabilized stibinidene, (DAC)Sb-Ph. Despite the exocyclic Sb(I) center being exposed, the compound exists as a monomer, with its stability attributed to the strong backbonding between the DAC and the antimony center. The steric bulk of the mesityl group in the carbene further contributes to the compound's kinetic stability. Density functional theory (DFT) calculations revealed that the stability of the compound arises from partial double bond character between the carbene carbon and the Sb(I) center. This is attributed to backbonding from the antimony center into the vacant p orbital of the carbene. Chloro-substituted stibinidenes have been trapped using a cyclic alkyl(amino)carbene (CAAC) ligand. The synthesis involved reduction of CAAC-coordinated SbCl_{3} with KC_{8}. Subsequently, the phosphine stabilized stibinidene (o-PPh_{2})C_{6}H_{4}(Ar*)Ge(Cl)Sb (E, where Ar* = 2,6-Trip_{2}C_{6}H_{3}), was reported.

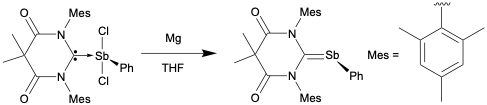
Scheme 3: Synthesis of a diamidocarbene (DAC) stabilized stibiinidene complex.

== Reactivity ==
Theoretically, singlet stibinidenes are ambiphilic due to the presence of both empty and filled 5p orbitals, which respectively confer Lewis acidic and Lewis basic character. However, N,C,N-pincer-coordinated stibinidenes exhibit diminished Lewis acidity because of n_{N} → p*_{Sb} donor-acceptor interactions. Despite this reduction in Lewis acidity, Dostál's stibinidene remains widely utilized in reactivity studies. In contrast, carbene-stabilized stibinidenes show significantly reduced reactivity as strong electron donation from the carbene ligand diminishes the Lewis acidic nature, while strong back-donation from the Sb center to the carbene weakens their Lewis basicity. Due to their ambiphilic nature, Dostál's stibinidenes are capable of activating small molecules, like disulfides, through oxidative addition. This reactivity arises from their ability to donate electron density to the LUMO of small molecules while simultaneously accepting electron density into the vacant 5p orbital. Dostál's N,C,N-coordinated stibinidene ArSb (where Ar = C_{6}H_{3}-2,6-(CH=NtBu)_{2}) has been reported to act as a catalyst in the hydroboration of disulfides (Scheme 5). This reactivity exploits the ability of the stibinidene to reversibly interconvert between Sb(I) and Sb(III) oxidation states under the reaction conditions. The catalytic cycle involves the oxidative addition of disulfides to the Sb(I) center, followed by reductive elimination to regenerate the active species, enabling efficient hydroboration. As of 2024, this is the only reported example of catalysis involving stibinidene, demonstrating its potential in organometallic catalysis. Notably, triplet stibinidenes exhibit a distinct mode of reactivity. Acting as diradicals, they can react with small molecules such as alkynes and butadienes, forming antimony-substituted heterocycles, including three-membered and five-membered rings respectively (Scheme 4).

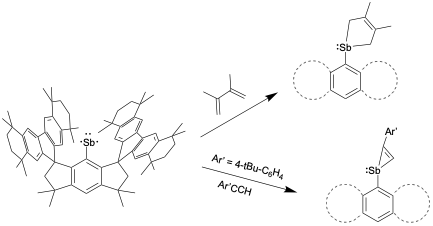
Scheme 4: Small molecule activation with triplet stibinidene.

=== Small molecule activation and catalysis ===
The stibinidene ArSb (where Ar = C_{6}H_{3}-2,6-(CH=NtBu)_{2}) oxidatively adds E_{2}Ph_{2} (E = S, Se), resulting giving ArSb(EPh)_{2} (Scheme 5). catalytic cycle using this oxidized product (Scheme 5). The Sb(III)dithiolate reacts with pinacolborane at 70 °C to produce ArSb(SR)(H) and the S-borylated thiophenol derivatives. This process can be made catalytic in the presence of an α,β-unsaturated carbonyl to facilitate Michael addition reactions.

Fluind ligand and reported by Cornella et al., exhibits remarkable small molecule activation. Under a 1.2 bar atmosphere of H_{2} or ethylene at 60°C, the distibene was converted into the corresponding antimony dihydride or stibacyclopropane, respectively, via a transient stibinidene intermediate. NMR studies confirmed that this transient stibinidene adopts a triplet electronic configuration, allowing it to activate small molecules in a diradical fashion. Similarly, the reactivity of an isolated triplet stibinidene was observed. Acting as diradicals, this stibinidene react with small molecules such as 2,3-dimethyl-1,3-butadiene and 4-tetrabutylphenylacetylene, leading to the formation of antimony-substituted heterocycles, including five-membered and three-membered rings.

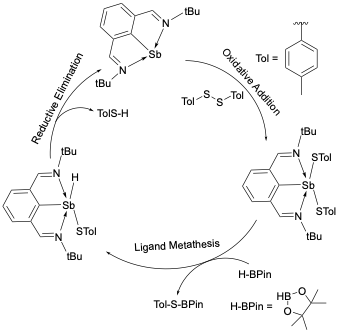
Scheme 5: The catalytic cycle for the hydroboration of disulfides via stibinidene involves oxidative addition at the Sb(I) centre.

=== Hetero Diels-Alder reaction with alkynes ===
The Dostál group demonstrated that N,C,N-pincer-coordinated stibinidenes can act as masked heterocyclic dienes. When treated with the electron-deficient alkyne dimethyl acetylenedicarboxylate (DMAD), these stibinidenes undergo a hetero Diels–Alder [4+2] cycloaddition reaction (Scheme 6). This transformation yields a CO_{2}Me-disubstituted 1-stiba-1,4-dihydro-iminonaphthalene, effectively converting one of the pendant imine arms of the stibinidene into a nitrogen-bridged stibacyclohexadiene. In this product, the Sb(III) atom serves as a bridgehead, while the second imine arm loses coordination with the Sb(III) center. Additionally, similar cycloaddition reactions were observed between Dostal's stibinidene and other substrates, such as methyl propiolate and N-alkyl/aryl-maleimides, RN(C(O)CH)_{2} (R = Me, ^{t}Bu, Ph). These findings highlight the reactivity of stibinidenes as dienes, expanding their utility in cycloaddition chemistry.

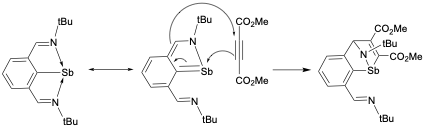
Scheme 6: Mechanism for the Diels-Alder reaction between Dostál's stbinidene and DMAD, with the diene region of the stibinidene.

=== Transition metal-"stabilized" stibinidenes ===
Complexes containing one or more ligands with the formula RSb (R = halide, alkyl, chloride, aryl) are called stibinidene complexes. The terminology is debatable because these complexes do not release RSb. As ligands, stibinidenes ligand resemble carbenes to some extent. bulky N,C,N-pincer ligands, phosphine based and gallium based ligand. Based on computational studies, ⲡ-donating substituents, such as nitrogen- and phosphorus-based anionic ligands attached to the pnictogen atom, significantly stabilize the singlet ground state of stibinidenes. In this state, the molecule features one stereochemically inactive lone pair with predominantly s-character and another lone pair with predominantly p-character, accompanied by a vacant p orbital, making stibinidenes ambiphilic (Figure 1). In contrast, σ-type ligands, such as hydride and alkyl groups, favor the triplet ground state, where two unpaired electrons occupy two 5p orbitals and one lone pair resides in the 5s orbital.

One early example is C_{6}H_{5}Sb[Mn(CO)_{2}(C_{5}H_{5})]_{2}, which was obtained from phenyldiiodostibane. The geometry at Sb is trigonal planar . the authors proposed the presence of Sb–Mn π-bonding. The chloro substituted stibinidene complex, [ClSb{Cr(CO)_{5}}_{2}] again features a three-center, four-π-electron bond across both Sb–Cr bonds. Trigonal planar stibinidene complexes of the type [ClSb{M(CO)_{5}}_{2}] (A, where M = Cr, Mo, W) are typically prepared via salt-elimination reactions between Na_{2}[M_{2}(CO)_{10}] and SbCl_{3} (Scheme 1). However, these complexes are highly unstable due to the vacant p orbital on the antimony center and, in the case of M = Mo or W, cannot easily be isolated. To stabilize these complexes, they can be trapped using Lewis bases (LB), forming stable adducts with the general formula [ClSb{M(CO)_{5}}_{2}LB] (B) (Scheme 1). Huttner and colleagues also identified distibene complexes of the type [RSb=SbR][W(CO)_{5}]_{3} as side products during stibinidene synthesis, particularly when non-donor solvents were used. This observation highlights the critical role of donor molecules in stabilizing these compounds.

Scheme 1: Synthesis of the transition metal stabilized chlorostibinidene complexes A and subsequent addition of a Lewis base.

== Stibinidene cation ==
Stibinidene cations are isoelectronic with carbenes (Scheme 8). The stibinidene cation was generated by reduction of SbX_{3} (X = F, Cl) with KC_{8}, in the presence of one equivalent of LiOTf, with stabilization provided by the addition of an IPr CAAC ligand. This process resulted in the formation of a CAAC-stabilized Sb(I) cation. Previously, attempts to stabilize Sb(I) cations were made using a bis(diisopropylamino)cyclopropenylidene ligand. However, the resulting species was obtained in low yield and exhibited significant instability, undergoing decomposition. Subsequently, Majumdar et al. reported the isolation of an Sb(I) cation stabilized with a diphosphine ligand. In this synthesis, SbCl_{3}, the bis(phosphine) ligand, and trimethylsilyl trifluoromethanesulfonate were reacted in a 1:2:3 ratio at room temperature. The bis(phosphine) ligand was found to act as both a reductant and a supporting ligand. Despite the overall positive charge of the Sb(I) site, it was observed to bind metal centers, forming complexes with Au(I), Ag(I), and Cu(I). Further progress was made by Zhenbo et al., who isolated an Sb(I) cation stabilized by a bis-silylene ligand. The lone pair on the Sb(I) center in this species was shown to coordinate with Cr and Mo carbonyls. Sb(I) cations can also be generated when a diiminopyridine ligand on Sb.

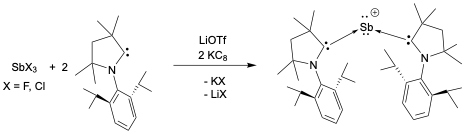
Scheme 8: Synthesis of Sb(I) cation stabilized by CAAC.
