= Potassium trifluoromethanesulfonate =

Names
- Preferred IUPAC name potassium;trifluoromethanesulfonate
- Other names potassium triflate, trifluoromethanesulfonic acid potassium salt

Identifiers
CAS Number	2926-27-4
3D model (JSmol)	Interactive image
ChemSpider	2015749
ECHA InfoCard	100.106.411
EC Number	608-334-4
PubChem CID	23664779
CompTox Dashboard (EPA)	DTXSID50635402
- InChI: Key: GLGXXYFYZWQGEL-UHFFFAOYSA-M
- SMILES: C(F)(F)(F)S(=O)(=O)[O-].[K+]

Properties
Chemical formula	CF_{3}KO_{3}S
Molar mass	188.16 g·mol^{−1}
Appearance	white powder
Melting point	235 °C (455 °F; 508 K)
Solubility in water	Soluble

Hazards
- GHS labelling
Pictograms	(GHS07: Exclamation mark)
Signal word	Warning
- Except where otherwise noted, data are given for materials in their standard state (at 25 °C [77 °F], 100 kPa). Infobox references

Potassium trifluoromethanesulfonate is the potassium salt of trifluoromethanesulphonic acid with the chemical formula CF_{3}KO_{3}S.

== Synthesis ==
The compound can be prepared by neutralizing a warm aqueous solution of trifluoromethanesulphonic acid with potassium carbonate.

== Physical properties ==
The compound forms a white hygroscopic powder. Soluble in water.

== Chemical properties ==
The compound reacts with sulfuric acid and, after distillation, produces trifluoromethanesulfonic acid.

== Uses ==
Potassium trifluoromethanesulfonate is used as a reagent in the creation of guanine-quadruplex hybrid materials. Additionally, it functions as a supporting electrolyte during electrochemical investigations that provide evidence for the presence of gold anions in ethylenediamine.

The compound can also be used as a component of the molten salt electrolyte in batteries.
