= Indium triflate =

Names
- IUPAC name indium(3+);tris(trifluoromethanesulfonate)
- Other names: Indium(III) trifluoromethanesulfonate; In(OTf)_{3}; In(TFA)_{3}; Indium(III) triflate; Trifluoromethanesulfonic acid indium(III) salt; Tris(trifluoromethanesulfonato)indium

Identifiers
CAS Number	128008-30-0
3D model (JSmol)	Interactive image; Interactive image
ChemSpider	2016424
ECHA InfoCard	100.157.173
EC Number	628-947-0
PubChem CID	16687927; 2734680
CompTox Dashboard (EPA)	DTXCID50321479
- InChI: InChI=1S/3CHF3O3S.In/c3*2-1(3,4)8(5,6)7;/h3*(H,5,6,7);/q;;;+3/p-3 Key: UCYRAEIHXSVXPV-UHFFFAOYSA-K
- SMILES: C(F)(F)(F)S(=O)(=O)O[In](OS(=O)(=O)C(F)(F)F)OS(=O)(=O)C(F)(F)F; [In+3].[O-]S(=O)(=O)C(F)(F)F.[O-]S(=O)(=O)C(F)(F)F.[O-]S(=O)(=O)C(F)(F)F

Properties
Chemical formula	C_{3}F_{9}InO_{9}S_{3}
Molar mass	562.01 g·mol^{−1}
Appearance	solid
Density	1.7 g/cm^{3}
Solubility in water	soluble

Hazards
- GHS labelling
Pictograms	(GHS07: Exclamation mark)
Hazard statements	H315, H319, H335
- Except where otherwise noted, data are given for materials in their standard state (at 25 °C [77 °F], 100 kPa). Infobox references

Indium triflate is a complex inorganic compound of indium, fluorine, carbon, sulphur, and oxygen with the chemical formula (CF_{3}SO_{3})_{3}In. This is the indium salt of trifluoromethanesulphonic acid. As a water-stable Lewis acid, the compound is a practical catalyst and finds wide application in organic synthesis.

== Physical properties ==
The compound forms a white, powdery solid. It is a Lewis acid, but unlike most other such compounds, it is not very sensitive to hydrolysis and is stable in aqueous solution.

It is soluble in organic solvents like acetonitrile and dichloromethane, but often reported as sparingly soluble in hydrocarbons.

== Synthesis ==
Indium triflate is typically synthesized by reacting indium(III) oxide with trifluoromethanesulfonic acid in water:

In_{2}O_{3} + 6HOTf → 2In(OTf)_{3} + 3H_{2}O

The compound is then isolated by filtering off excess oxide and evaporating the water.

== Uses ==
The compound serves as a catalyst and in synthesis of stable indium bacteriochlorins.
