= TFSI =

TFSI may refer to:

- Turbo fuel stratified injection, a type of internal combustion engine
- Bistriflimide, bis(trifluoromethane)sulfonimide
