= Triflyl group =

Chemical group (–SO2CF3)

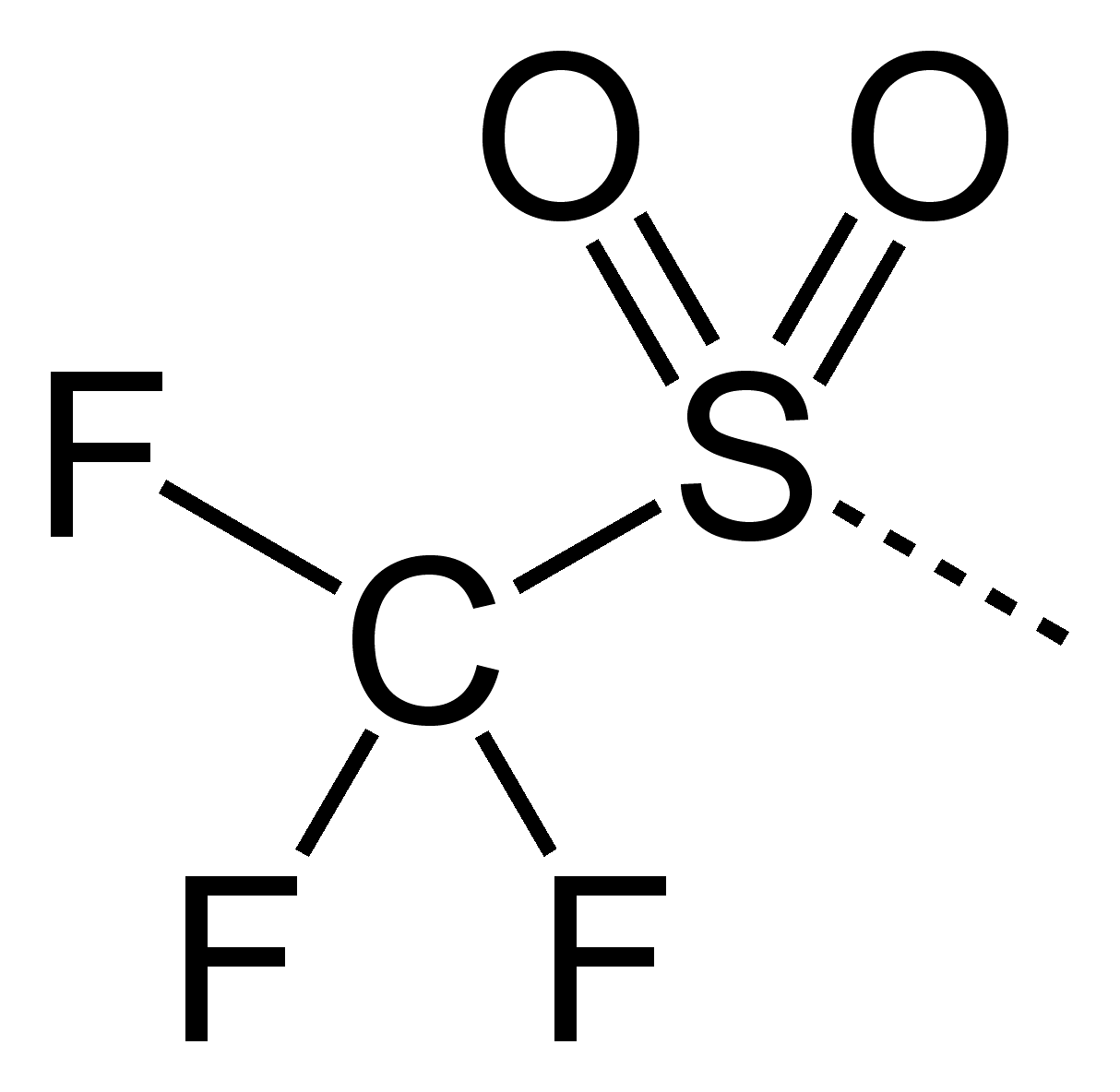
Triflyl group

In organic chemistry, the triflyl group (systematic name: trifluoromethanesulfonyl group) is a functional group with the formula R−SO_{2}CF_{3} and structure R−S(=O)_{2}−CF_{3}. The triflyl group is often represented by –Tf.

The related triflate group (trifluoromethanesulfonate) has the formula R−OSO_{2}CF_{3}, and is represented by –OTf.

== See also ==
- Triflyl azide, TfN_{3}
- Trioctylmethylammonium bis(trifluoromethylsulfonyl)imide, [MeN(C_{8}H_{17})^{+}_{3}][NTf^{−}_{2}]
- Comins' reagent
- Bis(trifluoromethanesulfonyl)aniline
- Triflic anhydride (CF_{3}SO_{2})_{2}O is a very strong triflating agent.
