= Triflate =

Chemical group (–OSO2CF3) or anion (charge –1)

Triflate group

Triflate anion

In organic chemistry, triflate (systematic name: trifluoromethanesulfonate), is a functional group with the formula R−OSO_{2}CF_{3} and structure R−O−S(=O)_{2}−CF_{3}. The triflate group is often represented by −OTf, as opposed to −Tf, which is the triflyl group, R−SO_{2}CF_{3}. For example, n-butyl triflate can be written as CH_{3}CH_{2}CH_{2}CH_{2}OTf.

The corresponding triflate anion, CF_{3}SO^{−}_{3}, is an extremely stable polyatomic ion; this comes from the fact that triflic acid (CF_{3}SO_{3}H) is a superacid; i.e. it is more acidic than pure sulfuric acid, already one of the strongest acids known.

== Applications ==
A triflate group is an excellent leaving group used in certain organic reactions such as nucleophilic substitution, Suzuki couplings and Heck reactions. Since alkyl triflates are extremely reactive in S_{N}2 reactions, they must be stored in conditions free of nucleophiles (such as water). The anion owes its stability to resonance stabilization which causes the negative charge to be spread symmetrically over the three oxygen atoms. An additional stabilization is achieved by the trifluoromethyl group, which acts as a strong electron-withdrawing group using the sulfur atom as a bridge.

Triflates have also been applied as ligands for group 11 and 13 metals along with lanthanides.

Lithium triflates are used in some lithium ion batteries as a component of the electrolyte.

A mild triflating reagent is phenyl triflimide or N,N-bis(trifluoromethanesulfonyl)aniline, where the by-product is [CF_{3}SO_{2}N−Ph]^{−}.

== Triflate salts ==
Triflate salts are thermally very stable with melting points up to 350 °C for sodium, boron and silver salts especially in water-free form. They can be obtained directly from triflic acid and the metal hydroxide or metal carbonate in water. Alternatively, they can be obtained from reacting metal chlorides with neat triflic acid or silver triflate, or from reacting barium triflate with metal sulfates in water:

MCl_{n} + n HOTf → M(OTf)_{n} + n HCl
MCl_{n} + n AgOTf → M(OTf)_{n} + n AgCl↓
M(SO_{4}) + n Ba(OTf)_{2} → M(OTf)_{2n} + BaSO_{4}↓

Metal triflates are used as Lewis acid catalysts in organic chemistry. Especially useful are the lanthanide triflates of the type Ln(OTf)_{3} (where Ln is a lanthanoid). A related popular catalyst scandium triflate is used in such reactions as aldol reactions and Diels–Alder reactions. An example is the Mukaiyama aldol addition reaction between benzaldehyde and the silyl enol ether of cyclohexanone with an 81% chemical yield. The corresponding reaction with the yttrium salt fails:

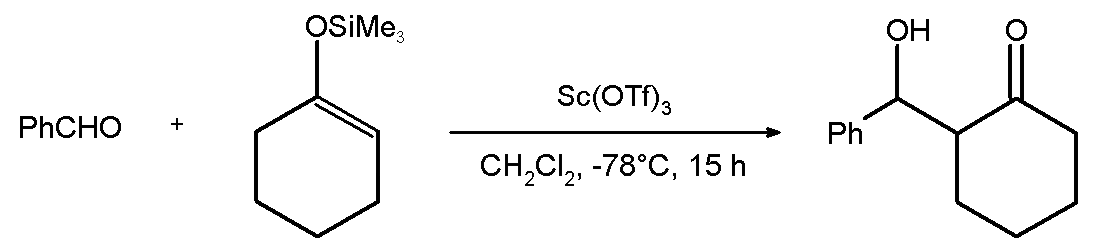
Sc(OTf)_{3}-mediated aldol condensation

Triflate is a commonly used weakly coordinating anion.

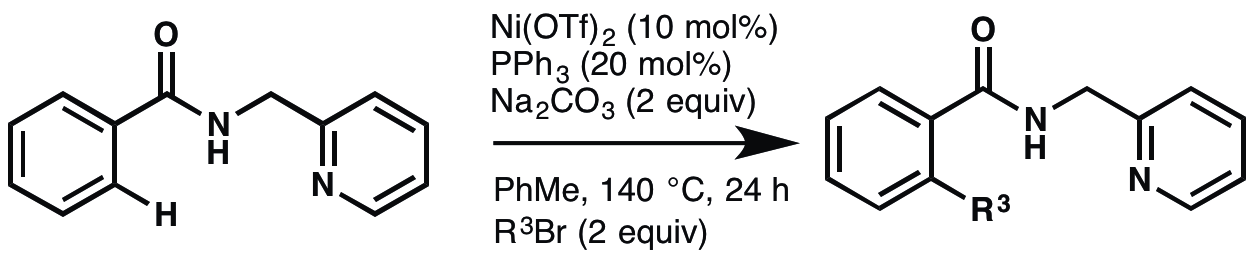
Use of Ni(OTf)_{2} to facilitate C–H functionalization

== See also ==
- Methyl triflate
- Nonaflate
- Trifluoromethanesulfonic acid
- Metal triflimidate
- Comins' reagent
- Lithium triflate
