= Robert Haszeldine =

British chemist

Robert Neville Haszeldine FRS, FRSC (3 May 1925 – 13 October 2016) was a British chemist. He is best known for his contributions to organofluorine chemistry, such as the discovery/invention of triflic acid.

== Life ==
He was educated at Stockport Grammar School and the University of Birmingham. Moving to the University of Cambridge he rose to assistant director of Research, before becoming Professor of Chemistry and Principal of the University of Manchester Institute of Science and Technology.

He had a two-acre garden in Great Langdale, Cumbria, which was regularly opened to the public under the National Garden Scheme.

He was elected Fellow of the Royal Society in 1968.

He died on 13 October 2016 at the age of 91.
