= Bistriflimide =

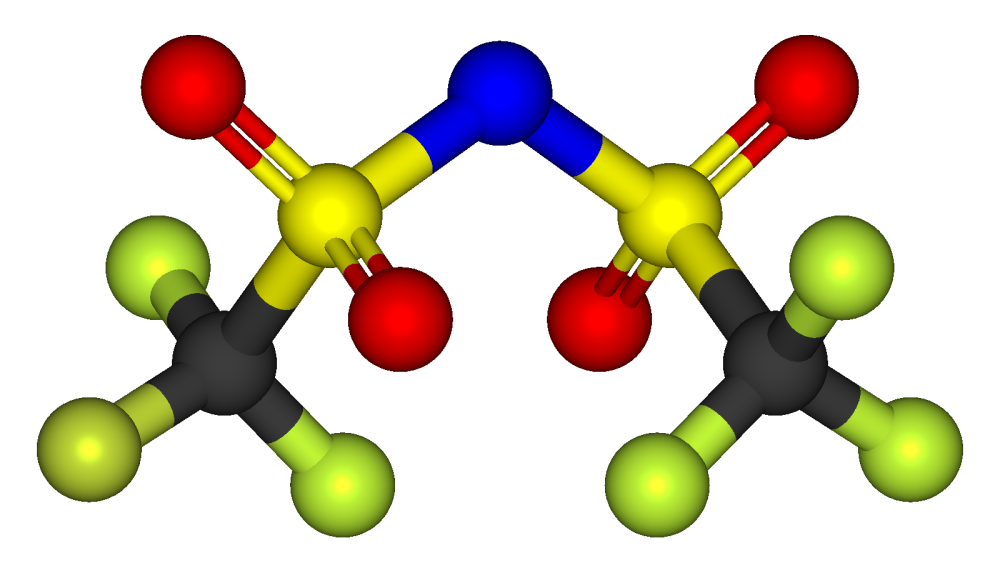

Names
- IUPAC name Bis(trifluoromethanesulfonyl)azanide

Identifiers
| CAS Number | acid: 82113-65-3; anion: 98837-98-0 |
| 3D model (JSmol) | acid: Interactive image; anion: Interactive image |
| ChEBI | anion: CHEBI:61320 |
| ChEMBL | acid: ChEMBL1237184 |
| ChemSpider | acid: 138894; anion: 3387945 |
| EC Number | acid: 435-300-4 |
| PubChem CID | acid: 157857; anion: 4176748 |
| UNII | acid: C7R849VM9L |
| CompTox Dashboard (EPA) | acid: DTXSID2045026; anion: DTXSID70872377 |
- InChI: acid: InChI=1S/C2F6NO4S2/c3-1(4,5)14(10,11)9-15(12,13)2(6,7)8/q-1 Key: NHHWJSXMTZIPES-UHFFFAOYSA-N; anion: InChI=1S/C2HF6NO4S2/c3-1(4,5)14(10,11)9-15(12,13)2(6,7)8/h9H Key: ZXMGHDIOOHOAAE-UHFFFAOYSA-N
- SMILES: acid: C(F)(F)(F)S(=O)(=O)NS(=O)(=O)C(F)(F)F; anion: C(F)(F)(F)S(=O)(=O)[N-]S(=O)(=O)C(F)(F)F

Properties
| Chemical formula | C_{2}F_{6}NO_{4}S_{2}^{−} |
| Molar mass | 280.14 g·mol^{−1} |
- Except where otherwise noted, data are given for materials in their standard state (at 25 °C [77 °F], 100 kPa). Infobox references

Bistriflimide, also known variously as bis(trifluoromethane)sulfonimide, bis(trifluoromethanesulfonyl)imide, bis(trifluoromethanesulfonyl)imidate (and variations thereof), informally and somewhat inaccurately as triflimide or triflimidate, or by the abbreviations TFSI or NTf_{2}, is a non-coordinating anion with the chemical formula [(CF_{3}SO_{2})_{2}N]^{−}. Its salts are typically referred to as being metal triflimidates.

== Applications ==
The anion is widely used in ionic liquids (such as trioctylmethylammonium bis(trifluoromethylsulfonyl)imide), since it is less toxic and more stable than more "traditional" counterions such as tetrafluoroborate. This anion is also of importance in lithium-ion and lithium metal batteries (LiTFSI) because of its high dissociation and conductivity. It has the added advantage of suppressing crystallinity in poly(ethylene oxide), which increases the conductivity of that polymer below its melting point at 50 °C.

== Bistriflimidic acid ==
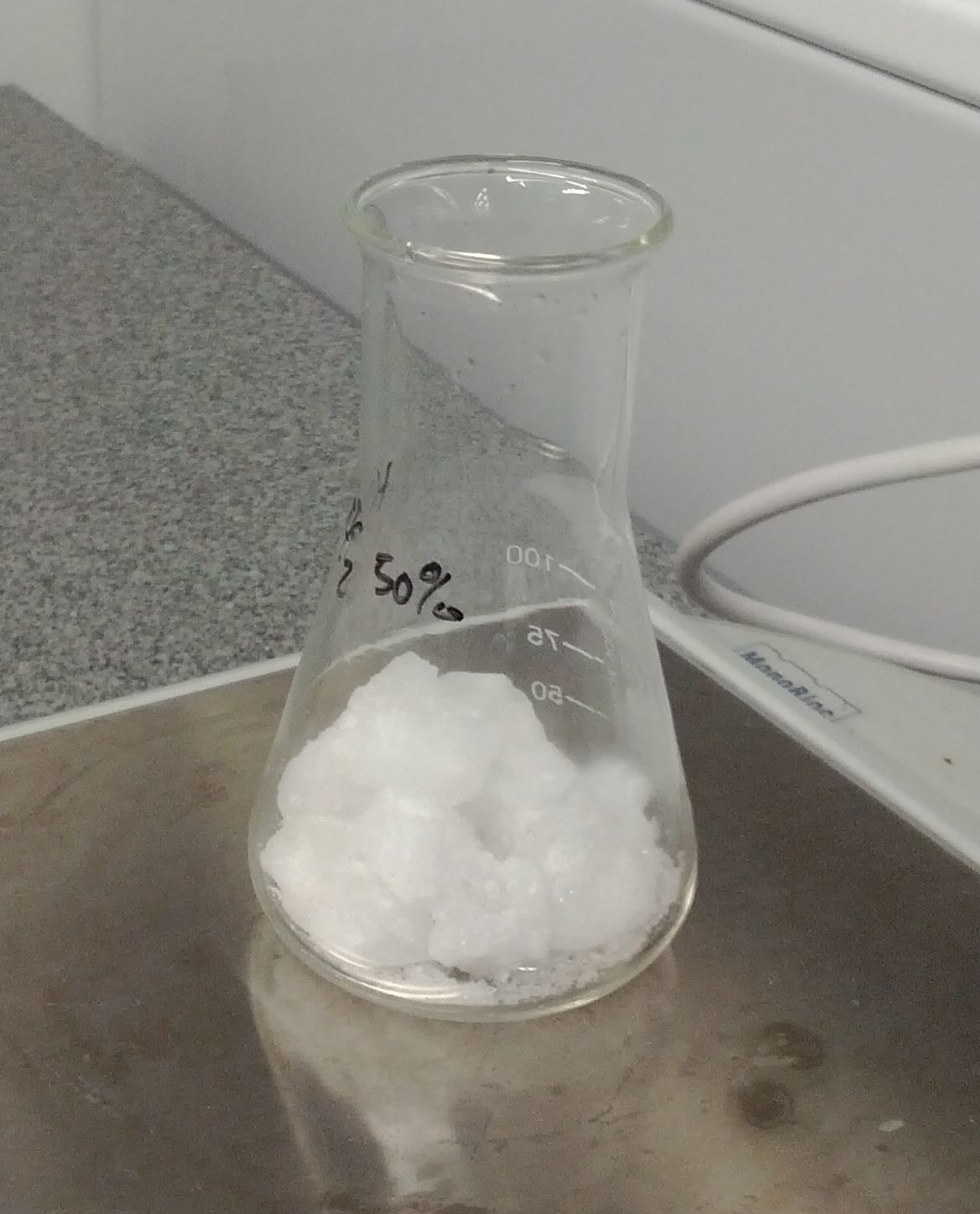
Bistriflimidic acid

The conjugate acid of bistriflimide, which is frequently referred to by the trivial name bistriflimidic acid (sometimes shortened to triflimidic acid; CAS: 82113-65-3), is a commercially available superacid. It is a crystalline compound, but is hygroscopic to the point of being deliquescent. Owing to its very high acidity and good compatibility with organic solvents it has been employed as a catalyst in a wide range of chemical reactions.

Its pK_{a} value in water cannot be accurately determined but in acetonitrile it has been estimated as −0.10 and in 1,2-dichloroethane −12.3 (relative to the pK_{a} value of 2,4,6-trinitrophenol (picric acid), anchored to zero to crudely approximate the aqueous pK_{a} scale), making it more acidic than triflic acid (pK_{a}^{MeCN} = 0.70, pK_{a}^{DCE}(relative to picric acid) = −11.4).

== Naming ==
Developing an IUPAC name for bistriflimide that indicates the structure and reactivity is challenging, and changes to current names have been proposed. The main difficulty arises from the ambiguous use of the word amide to mean an acylated (including sulfonylated) amine or the anionic form of an amine. Likewise, imide can refer to a bisacylated amine or a twice deprotonated amine. Thus, depending on the system used, there is ambiguity as to whether amide or imide is being used to refer to the parent acid or the anion. (The anion has been referred to as an amidate or imidate in an attempt to distinguish it from the acid.) The complications in naming these compounds was highlighted in an article by the IUPAC. Since then, the IUPAC has recommended (2013) that derivatives of anionic nitrogen can be named as azanides, so bis(trifluoromethanesulfonyl)azanide would be an acceptable and unambiguous name for the bistriflimide anion. The parent acid, whose trivial name is bistriflimidic acid, would then be called bis(trifluoromethanesulfonyl)azane.

The name 1,1,1-trifluoro-N-((trifluoromethyl)sulfonyl)methanesulfonamide is also an unambiguous IUPAC-acceptable name, though the symmetry of the molecule is not apparent from this construction.

== See also ==
- Triflic acid
- Triflidic acid
- Comins' reagent
