= Superconcentrated electrolytes =

Water-in-salt or solvent-in-salt liquids

Superconcentrated electrolytes, also known as water-in-salt or solvent-in-salt liquids, usually refer to chemical systems, which are liquid near room temperature and consist of a solvent-to-dissolved salt in a molar ratio near or smaller than ca. 4-8, i.e. where all solvent molecules are coordinated to cations, and no free solvent molecules remain. Since ca. 2010 such liquid electrolytes found several applications, primarily for batteries. In the case of lithium metal batteries and lithium-ion batteries most commonly used anions for superconcentrated electrolytes are those, that are large, asymmetric and rotationally-vibrationally flexible, such as bis(trifluoromethanesulfonyl)amide and bis(fluorosulfonyl)amide. Noteworthy, lithium chloride and sodium perchlorate also form water-in-salt solutions.

== Advantages ==
Superconcentrated electrolytes demonstrate the following advantages:

(1) Many show a good oxidative stability. In particular, some can suppress oxidative corrosion of an Al current collector without a source of fluoride ion (such as hexafluorophosphate) and enable the use of 5 V lithium-ion battery cathode materials.

(2) Some are resistant to electrochemical reduction. It is believed, that some sulfonimides (e.g., those with S-F and F-(H)C-N fragments, form a solid electrolyte interface similar to that formed by some organic carbonate solvents. Properties #1 and #2 are responsible for very large (4-5 volt) voltage window, which is useful for advanced batteries.

(3) Related to #2 is the ability of some superconcentrated electrolytes to allow for reversible intercalation of Li+ ions into graphite in the absence of ethylene carbonate solvent, therefore enabling a new class of safer lithium-ion batteries.

(4) Solvent vapor pressure is lower, thermal stability is higher, and flammability is absent, which contributes to a better battery safety.

(5) The concentration of charge-carrying ion is larger, which translates into smaller ion travelling distances.

(6) In some cases, and contrary to expectations, faster rates of electrode reactions are observed, than in conventional low-salt-concentration electrolytes.

(7) Polysulfide dissolution is sometimes suppressed, which enables cycling of such batteries as lithium-sulfur.

(8) Some studies report, that Li+ transference number in such liquids is close to one, which means, that Li+ concentration gradient between anode and cathode does not develop during the battery's charge and discharge.

(9) Electrodeposition of lithium metal from superconcentrated electrolytes is often nodular (without dendrites) and reversible.

== Disadvantages ==
At the same time, highly concentrated electrolytes are not without disadvantages:

(1) Their ionic conductivity is generally lower than that of corresponding dilute (~1 M) electrolytes.

(2) Their viscosity is higher than that of conventional electrolytes.

(3) Their cost is usually higher, because manufacturing of some anions, such as sulfonimides, requires several low-yield synthetic steps.

== Origin of the unusual properties ==
The exact mechanism of high-voltage stability of superconcentrated electrolytes have not been established as of 2023. The two main proposed mechanisms are:

(1) a decrease of water molecules' thermodynamic activity, when all water molecules are coordinated to cations, such as Li+.

(2) decomposition of an anion with the formation of a solid electrolyte interface.

Most recent studies suggest, that the anion decomposition mechanism (2) dominates in a majority of cases.
