= Bis(trifluoromethanesulfonyl)aniline =

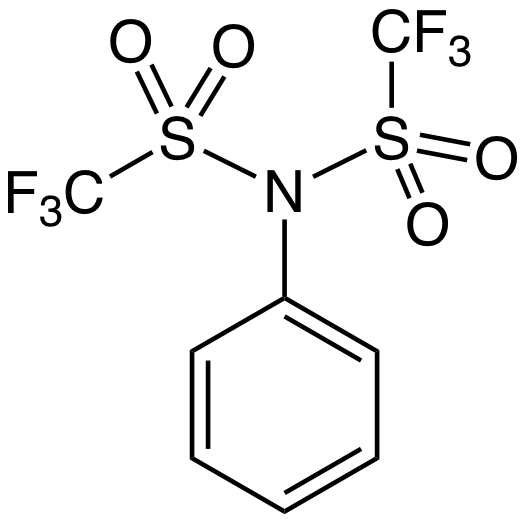

Names
- Preferred IUPAC name 1,1,1-Trifluoro-N-phenyl-N-(trifluoromethanesulfonyl)methanesulfonamide
- Other names Phenyl triflimide

Identifiers
CAS Number	37595-74-7
3D model (JSmol)	Interactive image
Beilstein Reference	1269141
ChemSpider	125415
ECHA InfoCard	100.116.996
EC Number	609-445-0
PubChem CID	142176
UNII	TIC0LRR43X
CompTox Dashboard (EPA)	DTXSID70191030
- InChI: InChI=1S/C8H5F6NO4S2/c9-7(10,11)20(16,17)15(6-4-2-1-3-5-6)21(18,19)8(12,13)14/h1-5H Key: DIOHEXPTUTVCNX-UHFFFAOYSA-N
- SMILES: C1=CC=C(C=C1)N(S(=O)(=O)C(F)(F)F)S(=O)(=O)C(F)(F)F

Properties
Chemical formula	C_{8}H_{5}F_{6}NO_{4}S_{2}
Molar mass	357.24 g·mol^{−1}
Appearance	White solid
Melting point	95–96 °C (203–205 °F; 368–369 K)
Boiling point	305 °C (581 °F; 578 K)

Hazards
- GHS labelling
Pictograms	(GHS07: Exclamation mark)
Signal word	Warning
Hazard statements	H315, H319, H335
Precautionary statements	P261, P264, P271, P280, P302+P352, P304+P340, P305+P351+P338, P312, P321, P332+P313, P337+P313, P362, P403+P233, P405, P501
- Except where otherwise noted, data are given for materials in their standard state (at 25 °C [77 °F], 100 kPa). Infobox references

Bis(trifluoromethanesulfonyl)aniline is the organic compound with the formula C_{6}H_{5}N(SO_{2}CF_{3})_{2}. It is a white solid. The compound is used to install the triflyl group (SO_{2}CF_{3}). Its behavior is akin to that of triflic anhydride, but milder.

== See also ==
- Comins' reagent, a related triflating reagent.
