= Copper(II) triflate =

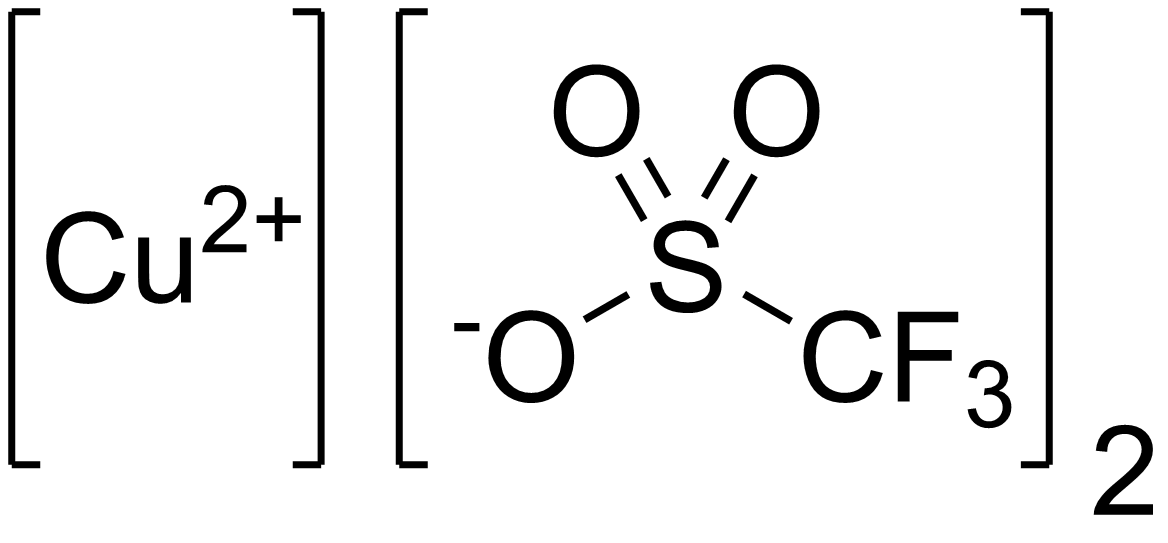
- Copper(II) triflate

Names
- IUPAC name Copper(II) trifluoromethanesulfonate
- Other names Copper(II) triflate

Identifiers
CAS Number	34946-82-2
3D model (JSmol)	Interactive image
ChemSpider	2016731
ECHA InfoCard	100.047.531
EC Number	252-300-8
PubChem CID	2734996
CompTox Dashboard (EPA)	DTXSID80894787
- InChI: InChI=1S/2CHF3O3S.Cu/c2*2-1(3,4)8(5,6)7;/h2*(H,5,6,7);/q;;+2/p-2 Key: SBTSVTLGWRLWOD-UHFFFAOYSA-L; InChI=1/2CHF3O3S.Cu/c2*2-1(3,4)8(5,6)7;/h2*(H,5,6,7);/q;;+2/p-2 Key: SBTSVTLGWRLWOD-NUQVWONBAL
- SMILES: [Cu+2].FC(F)(F)S([O-])(=O)=O.FC(F)(F)S([O-])(=O)=O

Properties
Chemical formula	C_{2}CuF_{6}O_{6}S_{2}
Molar mass	361.67 g·mol^{−1}
Appearance	white to pale blue powder
Solubility in water	very soluble, hygroscopic

Hazards
- NIOSH (US health exposure limits)
PEL (Permissible)	TWA 1 mg/m^{3} (as Cu)
REL (Recommended)	TWA 1 mg/m^{3} (as Cu)
IDLH (Immediate danger)	TWA 100 mg/m^{3} (as Cu)
- Except where otherwise noted, data are given for materials in their standard state (at 25 °C [77 °F], 100 kPa). verify (what is ?) Infobox references

Copper(II) triflate is the copper(II) salt of trifluoromethanesulfonic acid (known simply as triflic acid) which has a chemical formula of Cu(OSO_{2}CF_{3})_{2}, abbreviated Cu(OTf)_{2}. This substance, first reported in 1972, is a powerful Lewis acid. It is used as a catalyst in several organic reactions, such as the Diels–Alder reaction and cyclopropanation reactions (much like rhodium(II) acetate).
