= Scandium(III) trifluoromethanesulfonate =

Chemical compound

Names
- IUPAC name Scandium trifluoromethanesulfonate

Identifiers
CAS Number	144026-79-9
3D model (JSmol)	Interactive image
ChemSpider	2016319
ECHA InfoCard	100.157.499
PubChem CID	2734571
CompTox Dashboard (EPA)	DTXSID70370368
- InChI: InChI=1S/3CHF3O3S.Sc/c3*2-1(3,4)8(5,6)7;/h3*(H,5,6,7);/q;;;+3/p-3 Key: HZXJVDYQRYYYOR-UHFFFAOYSA-K; InChI=1/3CHF3O3S.Sc/c3*2-1(3,4)8(5,6)7;/h3*(H,5,6,7);/q;;;+3/p-3 Key: HZXJVDYQRYYYOR-DFZHHIFOAT
- SMILES: C(F)(F)(F)S(=O)(=O)[O-].C(F)(F)(F)S(=O)(=O)[O-].C(F)(F)(F)S(=O)(=O)[O-].[Sc+3]

Properties
Chemical formula	C_{3}F_{9}O_{9}S_{3}Sc
Molar mass	492.16 g/mol

Hazards
Safety data sheet (SDS)	Oxford MSDS
- Except where otherwise noted, data are given for materials in their standard state (at 25 °C [77 °F], 100 kPa). verify (what is ?) Infobox references

Scandium trifluoromethanesulfonate, commonly called scandium triflate, is the inorganic compound with formula Sc(H_{2}O)_{8}(OTf)_{3} where OTf is the anion CF_{3}SO_{3}^{-}. It is a salt consisting of scandium aquo complex. The structure of the anhydrous derivative is less certain. Like almost all scandium compounds, this salt is colorless.

== Syntheses and structure ==
The compound is prepared by reaction of scandium oxide with trifluoromethanesulfonic acid. Concentration of these solution gives crystals of the octahydrate salt. According to X-ray crystallography, the octahydrate features a square antiprismatic cation. The hydrated salt can be dehydrated to give anhydrous derivative.

== Use in organic synthesis ==
Scandium triflate is used as a reagent in organic chemistry as a Lewis acid. Compared to other Lewis acids, this reagent is stable towards water and has been used to catalyze organic reactions.

An example of the scientific use of scandium triflate is the Mukaiyama aldol addition reaction between benzaldehyde and the silyl enol ether of cyclohexanone with an 81% yield.

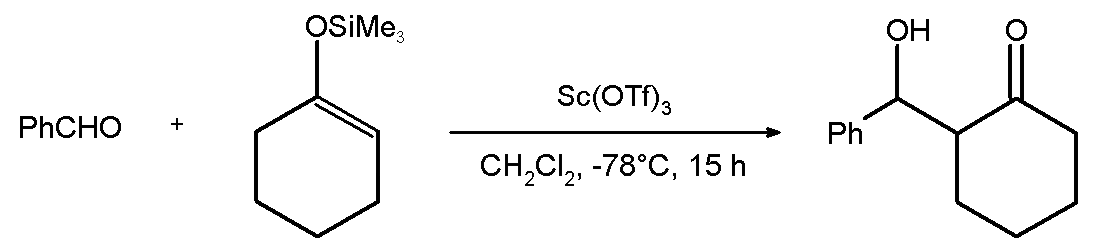
Sc(OTf)_{3}-mediated aldol condensation

== See also ==
- Lanthanide trifluoromethanesulfonates
