= Trichloromethanesulfonic acid =

Names
- Other names: Trichloromethylsulfonic acid

Identifiers
CAS Number	27153-10-2
3D model (JSmol)	Interactive image
ChemSpider	10667596
PubChem CID	14912291
CompTox Dashboard (EPA)	DTXSID90565299
- InChI: InChI=1S/CHCl3O3S/c2-1(3,4)8(5,6)7/h(H,5,6,7) Key: VYGSFTVYZHNGBU-UHFFFAOYSA-N
- SMILES: C(S(=O)(=O)O)(Cl)(Cl)Cl

Properties
Chemical formula	CCl_{3}O_{3}S
Molar mass	198.42 g·mol^{−1}
Appearance	Colorless liquid
Density	2.0 g/cm^{3}
Solubility in water	soluble

Hazards
- GHS labelling
Pictograms	(GHS05: Corrosive)
Hazard statements	H314
Precautionary statements	P260, P280, P301+P330+P331, P303+P361+P353, P304+P340+P310, P305+P351+P338+P310

Related compounds
Related compounds	Triflic acid; Methanesulfonic acid; Chlorosulfuric acid; Trichloroacetic acid
- Except where otherwise noted, data are given for materials in their standard state (at 25 °C [77 °F], 100 kPa). Infobox references

Trichloromethanesulfonic acid is an organochlorine compound with the chemical formula CCl_{3}SO_{3}H. It can also be classified as an organosulfur compound, specifically a sulfonic acid (RSO_{3}H). The compound serves as a precursor to trichloromethanesulfonate ("trichlate", CCl_{3}SO^{−}_{3}) salts.

== Structure ==
The molecule consists of a trichloromethyl group –CCl_{3} bonded to a sulfonic acid group –SO_{3}H. The strong electron-withdrawing effect of the three chlorine atoms significantly increases the acidity compared to that of methanesulfonic acid, but chlorine is less electron-withdrawing than fluorine.

== Synthesis ==
The acid can be prepared by the hydrolysis of trichloromethanesulfonyl chloride or via the chlorination of methanesulfonic acid. One laboratory method involves the reaction of carbon tetrachloride (CCl_{4}) with sulfur trioxide (SO_{3}) in the presence of mercury salts, though alternative routes using chlorosulfonic acid have also been reported.

== Uses ==
While not as widely used as triflic acid, trichloromethanesulfonic acid serves as a strong Brønsted acid catalyst in certain organic transformations, including: esterification reactions of carboxylic acids, the Friedel–Crafts acylations, and carbohydrate synthesis.

Its lower cost—compared to that of triflic acid—makes it an attractive alternative when maximum acidity is not required. The acid also finds use in the preparation of trichloromethanesulfonate salts (trichlates).
