= Trioctylmethylammonium bis(trifluoromethylsulfonyl)imide =

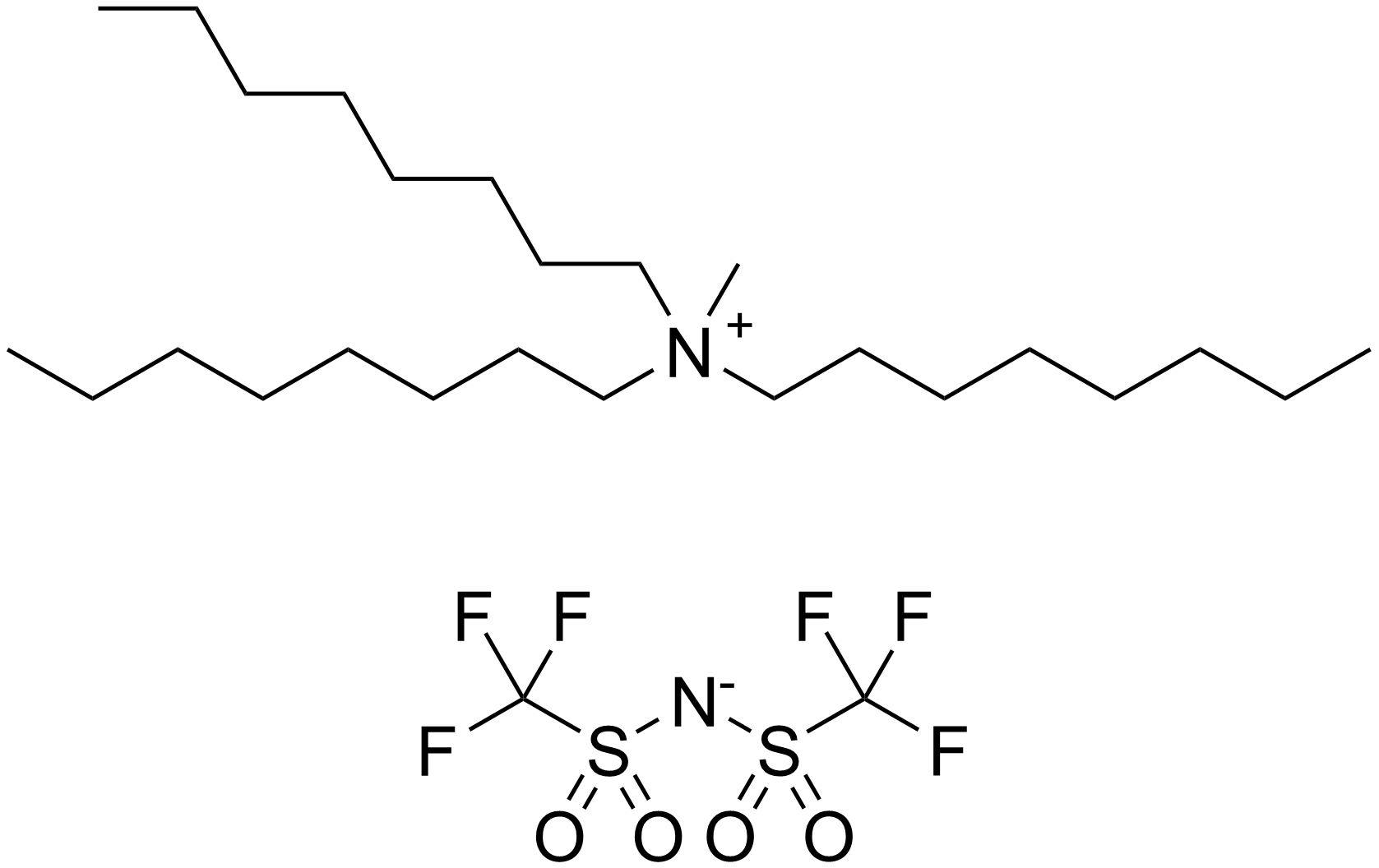
- Skeletal formula of trioctylmethylammonium bis(trifluoromethylsulfonyl)imide

Names
- Preferred IUPAC name N-methyl-N,N-di(octyl)octan-1-aminium bis(trifluoromethanesulfonyl)azanide
- Other names Methyl-trioctylammonium bis(trifluoromethylsulfonyl)imide

Identifiers
CAS Number	375395-33-8
3D model (JSmol)	Interactive image; Interactive image
ChEMBL	ChEMBL561679
ChemSpider	17339079
ECHA InfoCard	100.157.714
EC Number	629-541-6
PubChem CID	16211009
UNII	939A0J7H68
CompTox Dashboard (EPA)	DTXSID3047926
- InChI: InChI=1S/C25H54N.C2F6NO4S2/c1-5-8-11-14-17-20-23-26(4,24-21-18-15-12-9-6-2)25-22-19-16-13-10-7-3;3-1(4,5)14(10,11)9-15(12,13)2(6,7)8/h5-25H2,1-4H3;/q+1;-1 Key: LAGQNGWYNLUQRI-UHFFFAOYSA-N
- SMILES: FC(F)(F)S(=O)(=O)[N-]S(=O)(=O)C(F)(F)F.CCCCCCCC[N+](C)(CCCCCCCC)CCCCCCCC; O=S([N-]S(=O)(C(F)(F)F)=O)(C(F)(F)F)=O.CCCCCCCC[N+](CCCCCCCC)(C)CCCCCCCC

Properties
Chemical formula	C_{27}H_{54}F_{6}N_{2}O_{4}S_{2}
Molar mass	648.85 g·mol^{−1}

Hazards
- GHS labelling
Pictograms	(GHS07: Exclamation mark)
Signal word	Warning
Hazard statements	H315, H319, H335
Precautionary statements	P261, P264, P271, P280, P302+P352, P304+P340, P305+P351+P338, P312, P332+P313, P337+P313, P362, P403+P233, P405
Flash point	>110 °C

Related compounds
Related compounds	Bistriflimide
- Except where otherwise noted, data are given for materials in their standard state (at 25 °C [77 °F], 100 kPa). verify (what is ?) Infobox references

Trioctylmethylammonium bis(trifluoromethylsulfonyl)imide is an ionic liquid that is produced by Solvent Innovation, now part of EMD Chemicals.
