= Metal triflimidate =

A metal triflimidate M(NTf_{2})_{n} in organic chemistry is a metal salt or complex of triflimidic acid and used as a catalyst.

Metal triflimidates are prepared by reaction of metal oxides, carbonates, hydroxides, or halides with triflimidic acid in water as the hydrate M(NTf_{2})_{n}·xH_{2}O with x ranging from zero to nine. Another method is by metathesis reaction between a metal triflimidate and another metal complex by metal exchange. Commercially available salts are based on lithium and silver.

The catalytic activity of metal triflimidates has been demonstrated in cycloadditions, in various rearrangement reactions, in Friedel–Crafts acylation and Friedel–Crafts alkylation.

Lithium triflimidate is used as an electrolyte in batteries as a replacement of lithium perchlorate.

Gold phosphine or NHC triflimidates (LAuNTf_{2}, L = R_{3}P or NHC) are isolable though somewhat labile complexes of gold that serve as sources of catalytically active LAu^{+} ions.
