= Comins' reagent =

Comins' Reagent
- Skeletal formula of Comin's Reagent

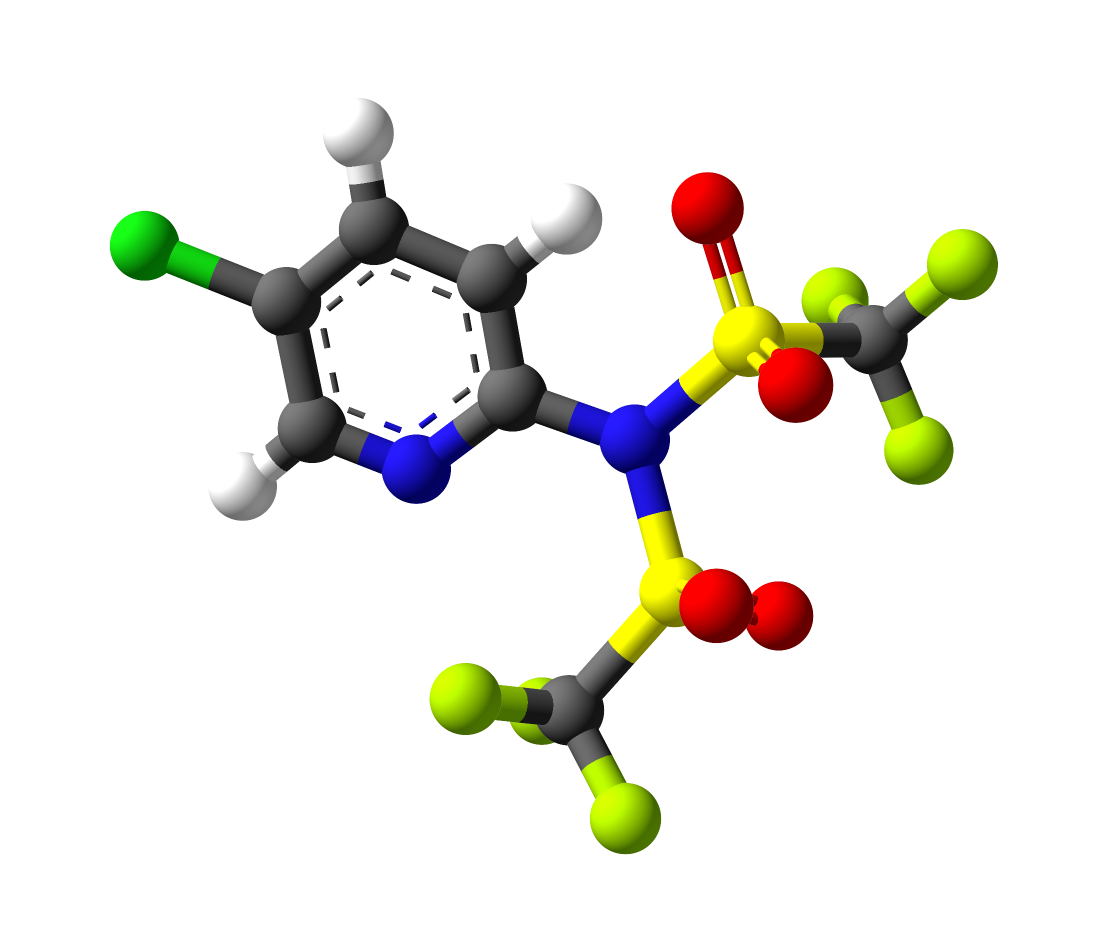

Names
- Preferred IUPAC name N-(5-Chloropyridin-2-yl)-1,1,1-trifluoro-N-((trifluoromethyl)sulfonyl)methanesulfonamide

Identifiers
| CAS Number | 145100-51-2 |
| 3D model (JSmol) | Interactive image |
| ChemSpider | 344376 |
| ECHA InfoCard | 100.157.321 |
| EC Number | 629-110-2 |
| PubChem CID | 388544 |
| UNII | WS933U9U66 |
| CompTox Dashboard (EPA) | DTXSID40327763 |
- InChI: InChI=1S/C7H3ClF6N2O4S2/c8-4-1-2-5(15-3-4)16(21(17,18)6(9,10)11)22(19,20)7(12,13)14/h1-3H Key: TUFGVZMNGTYAQD-UHFFFAOYSA-N; InChI=1/C7H3ClF6N2O4S2/c8-4-1-2-5(15-3-4)16(21(17,18)6(9,10)11)22(19,20)7(12,13)14/h1-3H Key: TUFGVZMNGTYAQD-UHFFFAOYAK
- SMILES: O=S(=O)(N(c1ccc(Cl)cn1)S(=O)(=O)C(F)(F)F)C(F)(F)F

Properties
| Chemical formula | C_{7}H_{3}ClF_{6}N_{2}O_{4}S_{2} |
| Molar mass | 392.67 g·mol^{−1} |
| Appearance | White solid |
| Melting point | 45 °C (113 °F; 318 K) |
- Except where otherwise noted, data are given for materials in their standard state (at 25 °C [77 °F], 100 kPa). Infobox references

The Comins' reagent is a triflyl-donating reagent that is used to synthesize vinyl triflates from the corresponding ketone enolates or dienolates.

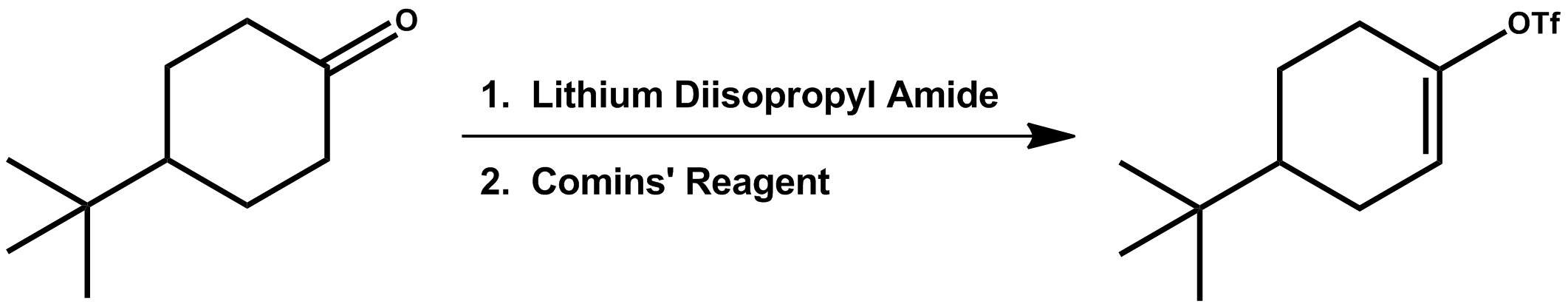
Sample Reaction With Comin's Reagent

It was first reported in 1992 by Daniel Comins. The vinyl triflates prepared are useful as substrates in the Suzuki reaction or other cross-coupling reactions.

== Mechanism ==
First an enolate is created through deprotonation of the carbonyl compound. Then the nucleophilic oxygen will attack one of the sulfurs while the rest of Comins reagent will work as a leaving group due to the good charge stabilization.

== See also ==
- Bis(trifluoromethanesulfonyl)aniline
