= Trifluoromethanesulfonic anhydride =

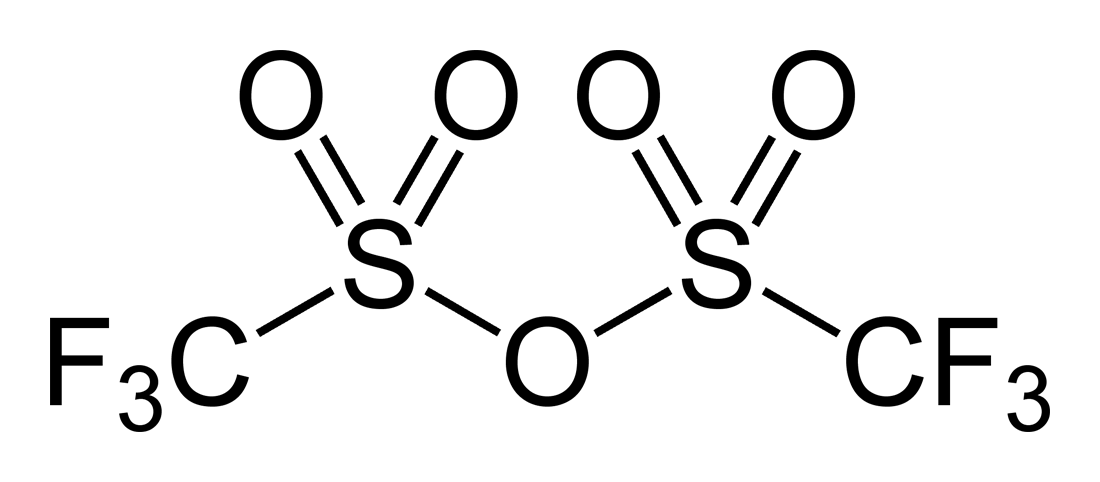
- Skeletal formula of triflic anhydride

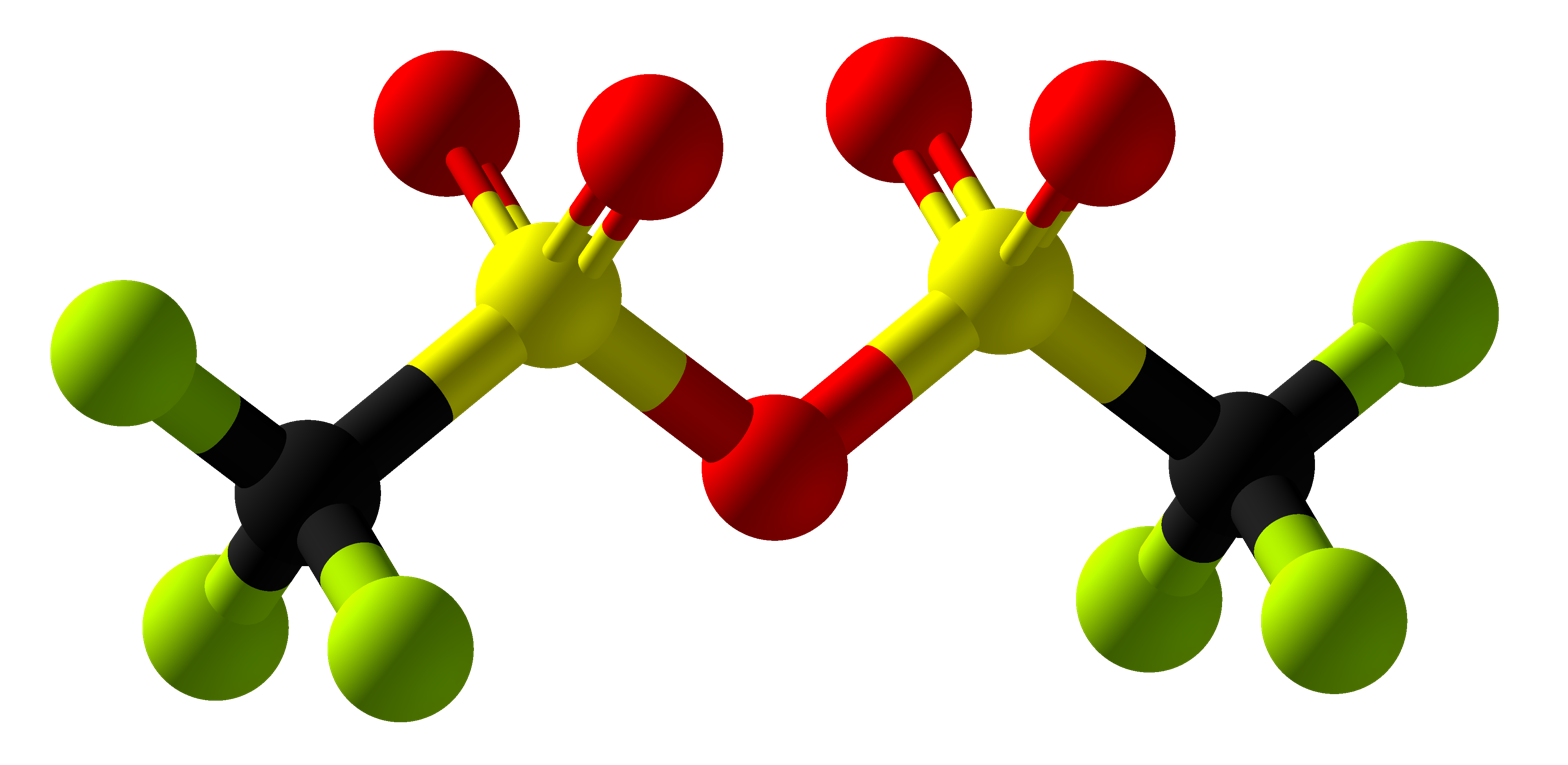

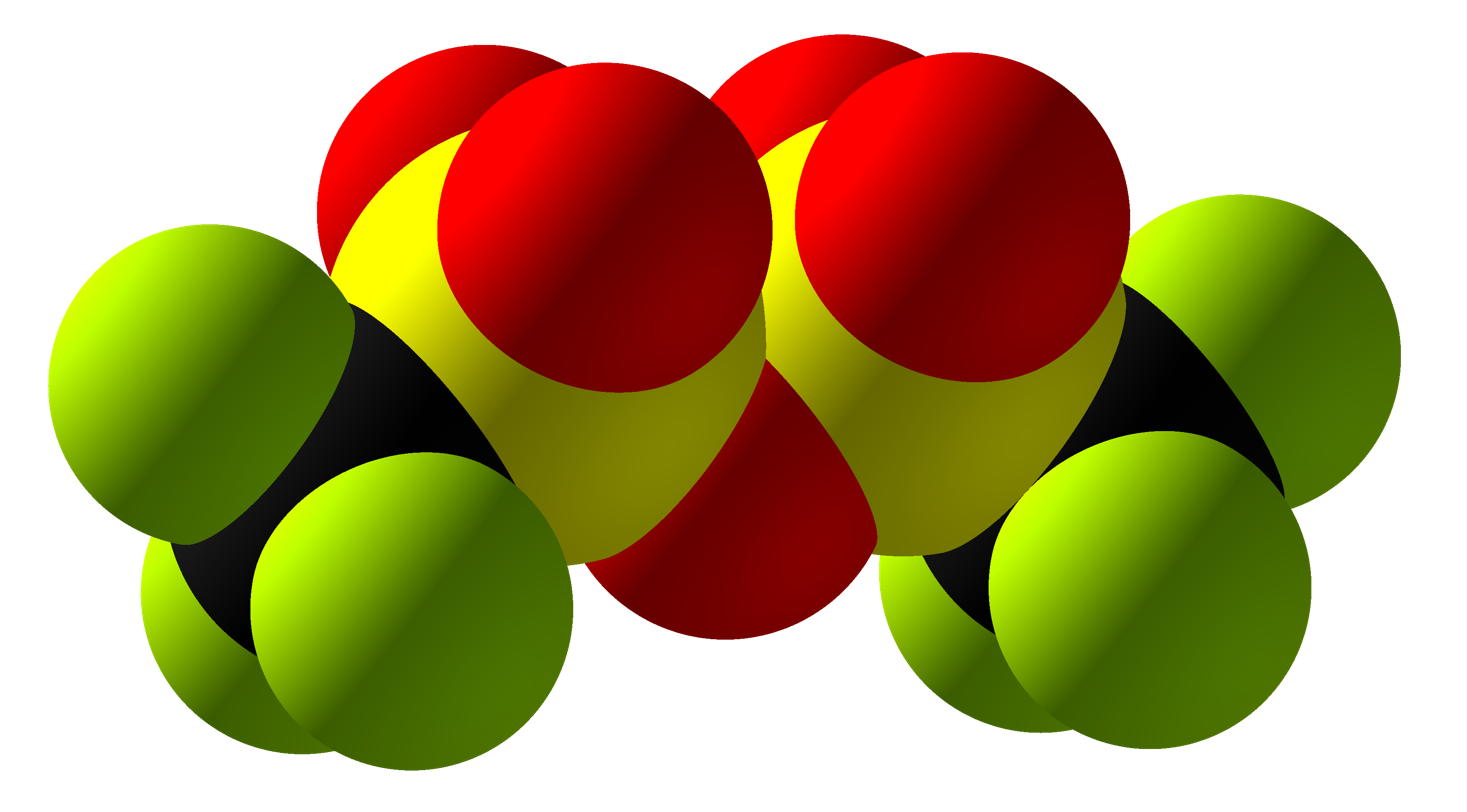

Names
- Preferred IUPAC name Trifluoromethanesulfonic anhydride

Identifiers
CAS Number	358-23-6
3D model (JSmol)	Interactive image
Beilstein Reference	1813600
ChEBI	CHEBI:48509
ChemSpider	61068
ECHA InfoCard	100.006.016
EC Number	206-616-8
PubChem CID	67749
UNII	8W034LHG1U
CompTox Dashboard (EPA)	DTXSID501014629
- InChI: InChI=1S/C2F6O5S2/c3-1(4,5)14(9,10)13-15(11,12)2(6,7)8 Key: WJKHJLXJJJATHN-UHFFFAOYSA-N
- SMILES: C(F)(F)(F)S(=O)(=O)OS(=O)(=O)C(F)(F)F

Properties
Chemical formula	C_{2}F_{6}O_{5}S_{2}
Molar mass	282.13 g·mol^{−1}
Appearance	colourless liquid
Density	1.6770 g/mL
Boiling point	82 °C (180 °F; 355 K)
Solubility in water	Reacts to form triflic acid

Hazards
- GHS labelling
Pictograms	(GHS03: Oxidizing) (GHS05: Corrosive) (GHS07: Exclamation mark)
Signal word	Danger
Hazard statements	H272, H302, H314, H335
NFPA 704 (fire diamond)	4 0 3 W; OX
Safety data sheet (SDS)	Fisher MSDS
- Except where otherwise noted, data are given for materials in their standard state (at 25 °C [77 °F], 100 kPa). verify (what is ?) Infobox references

Trifluoromethanesulfonic anhydride, also known as triflic anhydride, is the chemical compound with the formula (CF_{3}SO_{2})_{2}O. It is the acid anhydride derived from triflic acid. This compound is a strong electrophile, useful for introducing the triflyl group, CF_{3}SO_{2}. Abbreviated Tf_{2}O, triflic anhydride is the acid anhydride of the superacid triflic acid, CF_{3}SO_{2}OH.

== Preparation and uses ==
Triflic anhydride is prepared by dehydration of triflic acid using P_{4}O_{10}.

Triflic anhydride is useful for converting ketones into enol triflates.

In a representative application, is used to convert an imine into a NTf group. It will convert phenols into a triflic ester, which enables cleavage of the C-O bond.

== Assay ==
The typical impurity in triflic anhydride is triflic acid, which is also a colorless liquid. Samples of triflic anhydride can be assayed by ^{19}F NMR spectroscopy: −72.6 ppm vs. −77.3 for TfOH (std CFCl_{3}).

== Safety ==
It is an aggressive electrophile and readily hydrolyzes to the strong acid triflic acid, and it can be very harmful to skin and eyes.

== See also ==
- Methanesulfonic anhydride
