= Lithium triflate =

Names
- Preferred IUPAC name Lithium trifluoromethanesulfonate
- Other names LiOTf

Identifiers
CAS Number	33454-82-9
3D model (JSmol)	Interactive image
ChemSpider	105900
ECHA InfoCard	100.046.829
EC Number	251-528-5
PubChem CID	3664839
UNII	1C966KV50I
CompTox Dashboard (EPA)	DTXSID3044419
- InChI: InChI=1S/CHF3O3S.Li/c2-1(3,4)8(5,6)7;/h(H,5,6,7);/q;+1/p-1 Key: MCVFFRWZNYZUIJ-UHFFFAOYSA-M
- SMILES: [Li+].C(F)(F)(F)S(=O)(=O)[O-]

Properties
Chemical formula	CF_{3}LiO_{3}S
Molar mass	156.00 g·mol^{−1}
Appearance	White solid
- Except where otherwise noted, data are given for materials in their standard state (at 25 °C [77 °F], 100 kPa). Infobox references

Lithium triflate (lithium trifluoromethanesulfonate or LiOTf) is a salt with the chemical formula LiCF_{3}SO_{3}. It is composed of the lithium cation (Li^{+}) and triflate anion (CF_{3}SO_{3}^{−}; TfO^{−}). It is very hygroscopic. The salt is used in lithium-ion battery production.

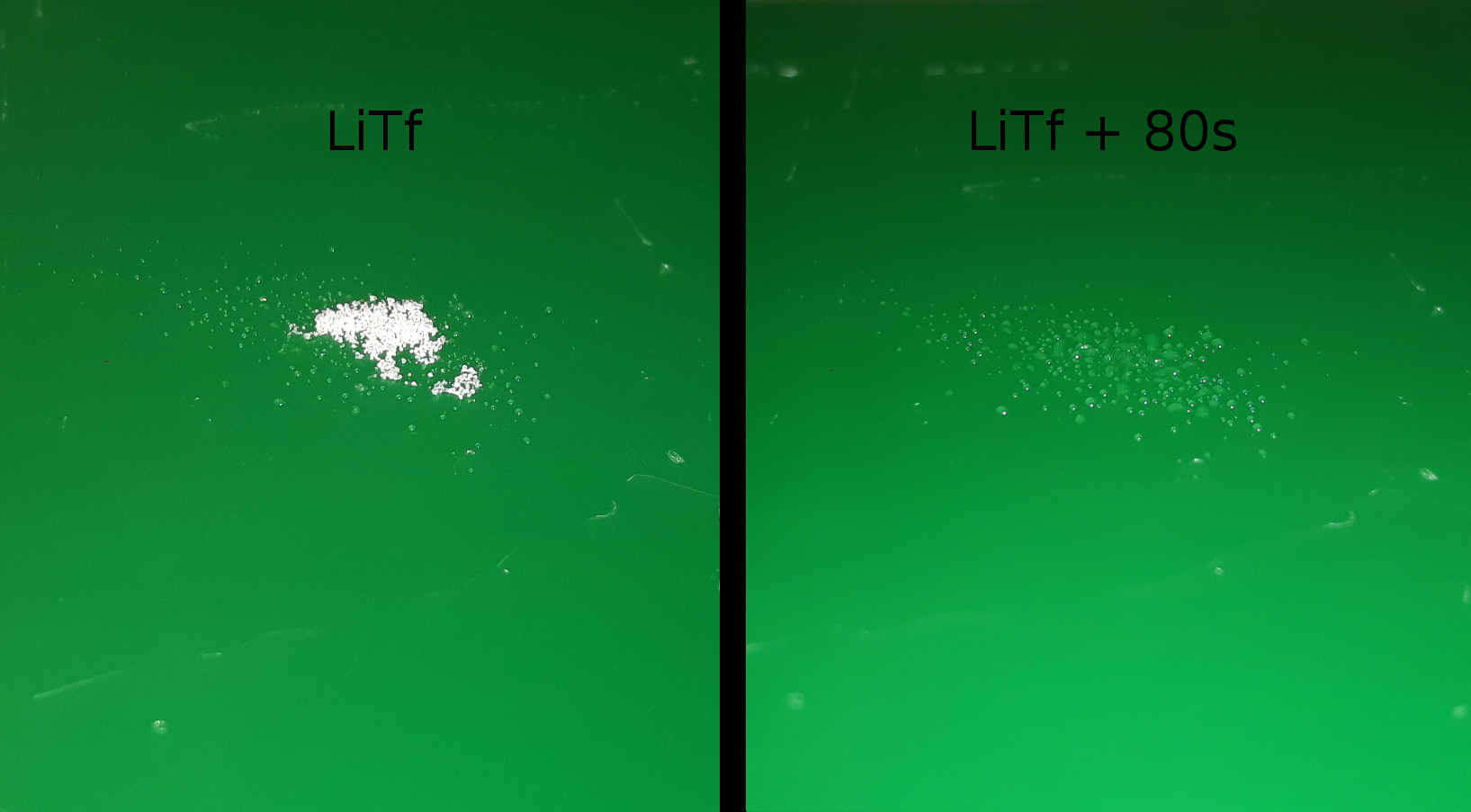
Lithium triflate is hygroscopic and absorbs water from air humidity
