= Methanesulfonic acid =

Organosulfur compound (CHSO2OH)

- Structural formula of methanesulfonic acid

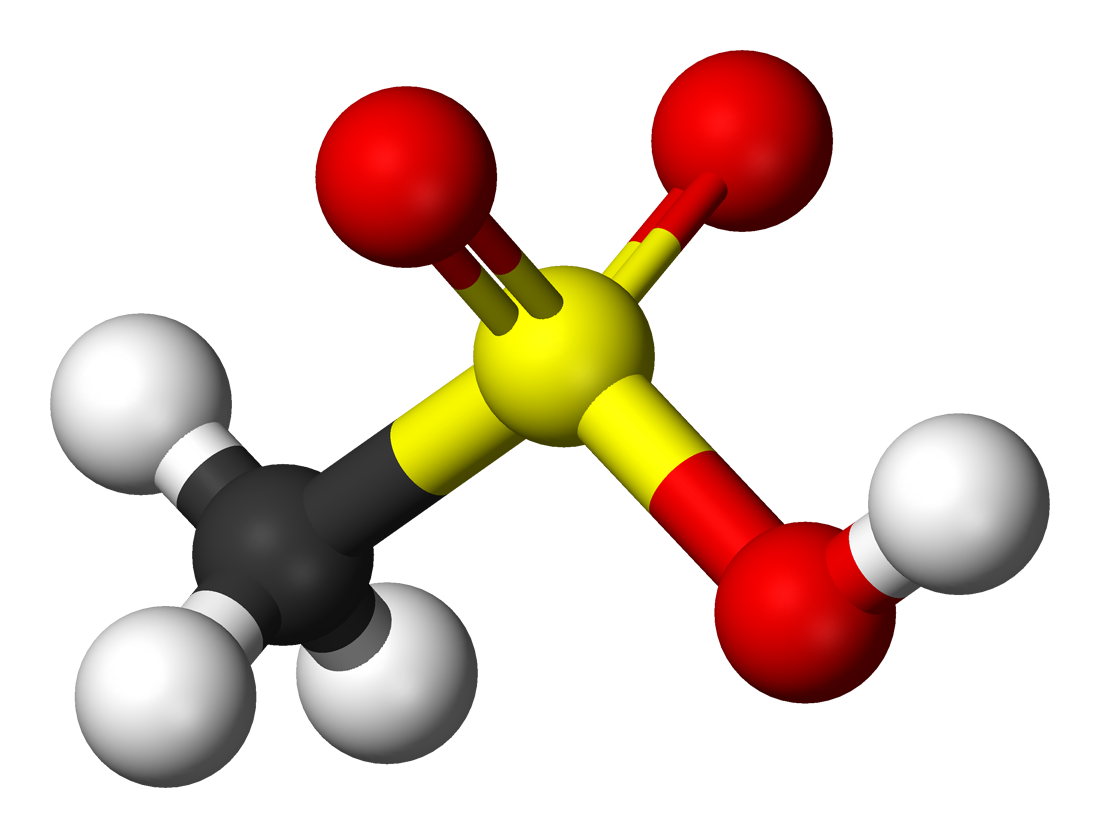
- Ball-and-stick model of methanesulfonic acid

Names
- Preferred IUPAC name Methanesulfonic acid
- Other names Methylsulfonic acid, MSA; Mesylic acid

Identifiers
CAS Number	75-75-2
3D model (JSmol)	Interactive image
Abbreviations	MSA; MsOH
Beilstein Reference	1446024
ChEBI	CHEBI:27376
ChemSpider	6155
ECHA InfoCard	100.000.817
EC Number	200-898-6
Gmelin Reference	1681
PubChem CID	6395
UNII	12EH9M7279
UN number	2585
CompTox Dashboard (EPA)	DTXSID4026422
- InChI: InChI=1S/CH4O3S/c1-5(2,3)4/h1H3,(H,2,3,4) Key: AFVFQIVMOAPDHO-UHFFFAOYSA-N; InChI=1/CH4O3S/c1-5(2,3)4/h1H3,(H,2,3,4)/f/h2H; InChI=1/CH4O3S/c1-5(2,3)4/h1H3,(H,2,3,4) Key: AFVFQIVMOAPDHO-UHFFFAOYAS
- SMILES: O=S(=O)(O)C

Properties
Chemical formula	CH_{4}O_{3}S
Molar mass	96.10 g·mol^{−1}
Appearance	Clear, colourless liquid
Density	1.48 g/cm^{3}
Melting point	17 to 19 °C (63 to 66 °F; 290 to 292 K)
Boiling point	167 °C (333 °F; 440 K) at 10 mmHg, 122 °C/1 mmHg
Solubility in water	miscible
Solubility	Miscible with methanol, diethyl ether. Immiscible with hexane
log P	−2.424
Acidity (pK_{a})	−1.9

Hazards
- GHS labelling
Pictograms	(GHS05: Corrosive)
Signal word	Danger
Hazard statements	H314
Precautionary statements	P260, P264, P280, P301+P330+P331, P303+P361+P353, P304+P340, P305+P351+P338, P310, P321, P363, P405, P501
Safety data sheet (SDS)	Oxford MSDS
- Except where otherwise noted, data are given for materials in their standard state (at 25 °C [77 °F], 100 kPa). verify (what is ?) Infobox references

Methanesulfonic acid (MsOH, MSA) is an organosulfuric, colorless liquid with the molecular formula CH_{3}SO_{3}H and structure H_{3}C−S(=O)_{2}−OH. It is the simplest of the alkylsulfonic acids (R−S(=O)_{2}−OH). Salts and esters of methanesulfonic acid are known as mesylates (or methanesulfonates, as in ethyl methanesulfonate). It is hygroscopic.

== History and synthesis ==
=== Early history ===
German chemist Hermann Kolbe discovered MSA between 1842 and 1845 and originally termed it methyl hyposulphuric acid.

The discovery stemmed from earlier work by Berzelius and Marcet in 1813, who treated carbon disulfide with moist chlorine and produced a compound they named "sulphite of chloride of carbon". By reacting it with barium hydroxide Kolbe demonstrated it to actually be trichloromethylsulfonyl chloride (CCl_{3}SO_{2}Cl).

2 CCl_{3}SO_{2}Cl + 3 Ba(OH)_{2} → Ba(CCl_{3}SO_{3})_{2} + 3 BaCl_{2} + 2 H_{2}O

From the resulting barium trichloromethylsulfonate Kolbe isolated the free acid, which he was then able to sequentially dechlorinate by electrolytically generated atomic hydrogen to ultimately yield MSA.

CCl_{3}SO_{3}H + 3 H → CHCl_{2}SO_{3}H + 2 H + HCl → … → CH_{3}SO_{3}H + 3 HCl

Kolbe's research on methanesulfonic and chloroacetic acids was hailed by Berzelius as strong evidence for his theory of copulated compounds, a modification of radical theory to accommodate substitution reactions which posited the combination of organic and inorganic moieties without significantly altering the properties of the latter.

Later in the 19th century, the name transitioned to methyl sulphonic acid. Other historical laboratory synthesis routes included oxidizing methanethiol, dimethyl disulfide or methyl thiocyanate with nitric acid.

=== Industrial production ===
The first commercial production of MSA, developed in the 1940s by Standard Oil of Indiana, was based on oxidation of dimethylsulfide by O_{2} from air. Although inexpensive, this process suffered from poor product quality and explosion hazards.

Starting from the 1960s, it received a shortened name of mesylic acid after the term for the "mesyl" group coined by Helferich et al. in 1938.

In 1967, the Pennwalt Corporation (USA) developed a different process for dimethylsulfide (as a water-based emulsion) oxidation using chlorine, followed by extraction-purification. In 2022 this chlorine-oxidation process was used only by Arkema (France) for making high-purity MSA. This process is not popular on a large scale, because it co-produces large quantities of hydrochloric acid.

Between 1970 and 2000, MSA was used only on a relatively small-scale in niche markets (for example, in the microelectronic and electroplating industries since the 1980s), which was mainly due to its rather high price and limited availability. However, this situation changed around 2003, when BASF launched commercial production of MSA in Ludwigshafen based on a modified version of the aforementioned air oxidation process, oxidising dimethyldisulfide with nitric acid which is then restored using atmospheric oxygen. The former is produced in one step from methanol from syngas, hydrogen and sulfur.

An even better (lower-cost and environmentally friendlier) process of making methanesulfonic acid was developed in 2016 by Grillo-Werke AG (Germany). It is based on a direct reaction between methane and oleum at around 50 °C and 100 bar in the presence of a potassium persulfate initiator. Further addition of sulfur trioxide gives methanedisulfonic acid instead. This technology was acquired and commercialized by BASF in 2019.

== Applications ==
Since ca. 2000 methanesulfonic acid has been promoted as a replacement for other acids in industrial and laboratory applications. Methanesulfonic acid can dissolve a wide range of metal salts, many of them in significantly higher concentrations than in hydrochloric acid (HCl) or sulfuric acid (H_{2}SO_{4}).

It has the following features:

- is a strong acid,
- has a low vapor pressure (see boiling points in the "Properties" inset),
- is not an oxidant, in contrast to nitric, sulfuric or perchloric acids.
- is a liquid at room temperature (The closely related p-toluenesulfonic acid (PTSA) is solid),
- is soluble in many organic solvents,
- forms water-soluble salts with all inorganic cations and with most organic cations,
- does not form complexes with metal ions in water,
- its anion, mesylate, is non-toxic and suitable for pharmaceutical preparations.

Methanesulfonic acid can be used in the generation of borane (BH_{3}) by reacting methanesulfonic acid with NaBH_{4} in an aprotic solvent such as THF or DMSO, the complex of BH_{3} and the solvent is formed.

=== Applications ===
Solutions of methanesulfonic acid are used for the electroplating of tin and tin-lead solders. It is displacing the use of fluoroboric acid, which releases corrosive and volatile hydrogen fluoride.

Methanesulfonic acid is also a primary ingredient in rust and scale removers. It is used to clean off surface rust from ceramic, tiles and porcelain which are usually susceptible to acid attack.

== See also ==
- Trichloromethanesulfonic acid, a trichloro analogue
- Trifluoromethanesulfonic acid, the more acidic trifluoro analogue
