= Lanthanide trifluoromethanesulfonates =

Triflate salts of the lanthanides

Lanthanide triflates are triflate salts of the lanthanides. These salts have been investigated for application in organic synthesis as Lewis acid catalysts. These catalysts function similarly to aluminium chloride or ferric chloride, but they are water-tolerant (stable in water). Commonly written as Ln(OTf)_{3}·(H_{2}O)_{9} the nine waters are bound to the lanthanide, and the triflates are counteranions, so more accurately lanthanide triflate nonahydrate is written as Ln(H_{2}O)_{9}(OTf)_{3}.

== Synthesis ==
Lanthanide triflates are synthesized from lanthanide oxide and aqueous triflic acid:

Ln_{2}O_{3} + 6 HOTf + 18 H_{2}O → 2 Ln(H_{2}O)_{9}(OTf)_{3} + 3 H_{2}O

Anhydrous lanthanide triflates can be produced by dehydrating their hydrated counterparts by heating between 180 and 200 °C under reduced pressure:

Ln(H_{2}O)_{9}(OTf)_{3} → Ln(OTf)_{3} + 9 H_{2}O

== Example reactions ==
=== Friedel-Crafts reactions ===
Lanthanide triflates are proposed for Friedel-Crafts acylations and alkylations, which are often carried out with AlCl_{3} as the catalyst in an organic solvent. The nature of the Friedel-Craft reaction, especially the acylation, forces the AlCl_{3} to irreversibly complex with any oxygen-containing group in the product, with the only way of decomplexing it being to destroy the AlCl_{3} part with water altogether. An estimated 0.9 kg of AlCl_{3} is wasted per kilogram of typical product - it is hydrolysed into Al_{2}O_{3} and the corrosive HCl.

In contrast, lanthanide triflates' complexes with the product are easily separated by water, and the lanthanide triflate hydrate thus formed can be simply heated to boil the water away (This does not work for aluminium chloride due to loss of HCl; same goes for the lanthanide chlorides, hence the necessity of the triflate counterion). This avoids the need to use organic solvents- one can just use water as the solvent.

Ln(OTf)_{3} catalysts are used for esterifications.

=== Other C-C bond-forming reactions ===
La(OTf)_{3} catalysts have been used for Diels-Alder, aldol, and allylation reactions. Some reactions require a mixed solvent, such as aqueous formaldehyde, although Kobayashi et al. have developed alternative surfactant-water systems.

Michael additions are another very important industrial method for creating new carbon-carbon bonds, often with particular functional groups attached. Addition reactions are inherently atom efficient, so are preferred synthesis pathways. La(OTf)_{3} catalysts not only enable these reactions to be carried out in water, but can also achieve asymmetric catalysis, yielding a desired enantio-specific or diastereo-specific product.

=== C-N bond-forming reactions ===
Lanthanide triflates can be used to synthesize pyridine by catalysing either the condensation of aldehydes and amines, or the aza Diels-Alder reaction catalytic synthesis. Again, water can be used as a solvent, and high yields can be achieved under mild conditions.

Nitro compounds are common in pharmaceuticals, explosives, dyes, and plastics. As for carbon compounds, catalysed Michael additions and aldol reactions can be used. For aromatic nitro compounds, synthesis is via a substitution reaction. The standard synthesis is carried out in a solution of nitric acid, mixed with excess sulfuric acid to create nitronium ions. These are then substituted on to the aromatic species. Often, the para-isomer is the desired product, but standard systems have poor selectivity. As for acylation, the reaction is normally quenched with water, and creates copious acidic waste. Using a La(OTf)_{3} catalyst in place of sulfuric acid reduces this waste considerably. Clark et al. report 90% conversion using just 1 mol% of ytterbium triflate in weak nitric acid, generating only a small volume of acidic waste.

=== Green catalysts ===
Lanthanide triflates are stable in water, so avoid the need for organic solvents, and can be recovered for reuse. on their catalytic effect in water, the range of researched applications for La(OTf)_{3} catalysts has exploded.

== See also ==
- Scandium(III) trifluoromethanesulfonate
