= Triflic acid =

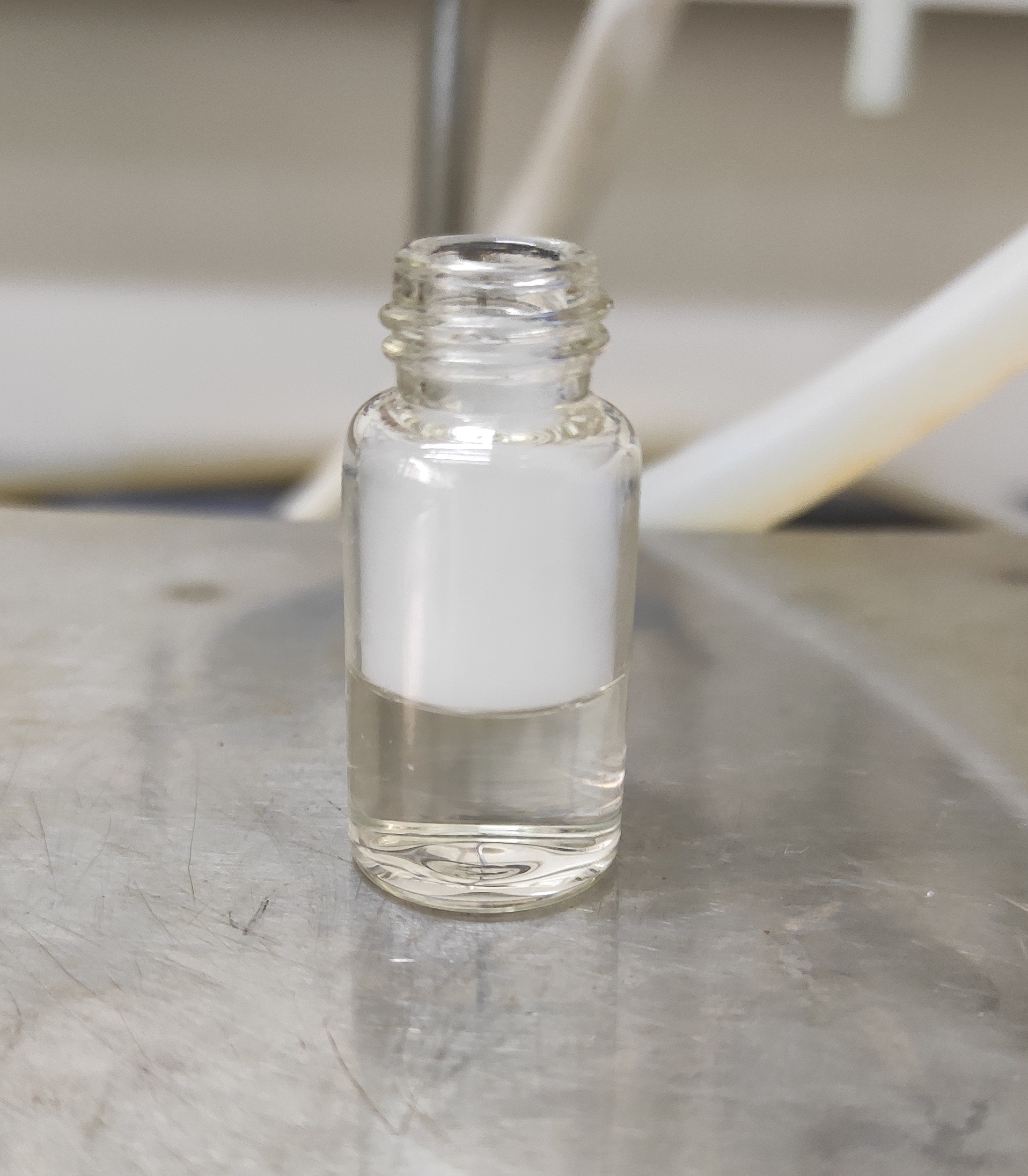

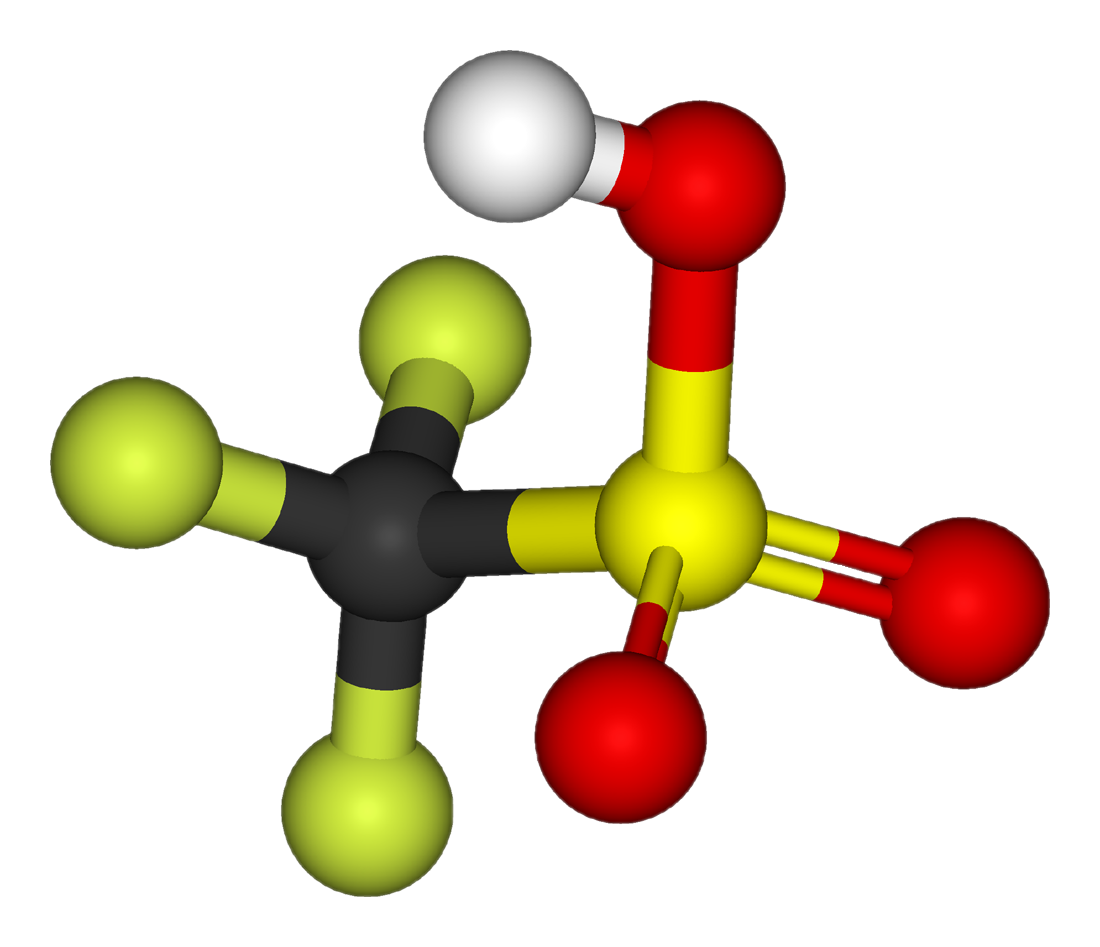

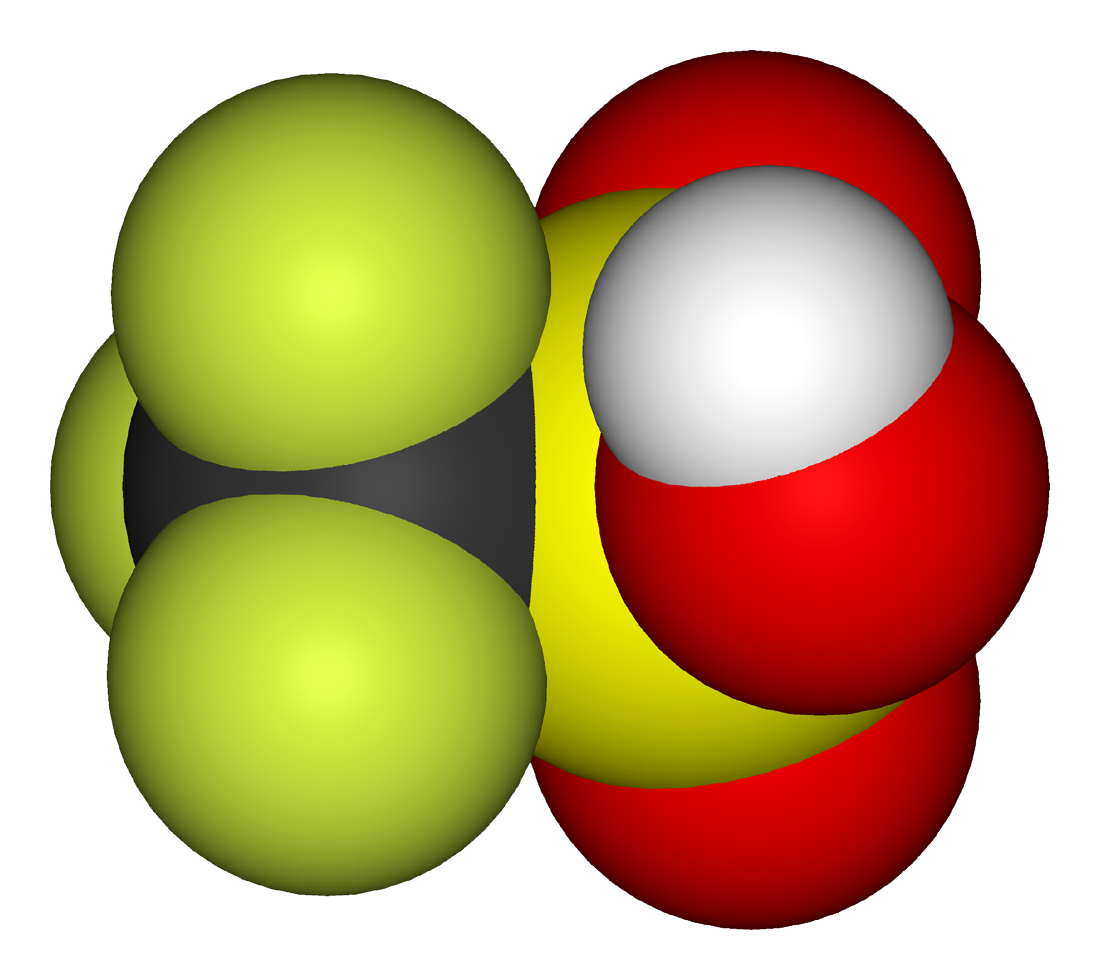

Names
- IUPAC name Trifluoromethanesulfonic acid
- Other names Triflic acid

Identifiers
| CAS Number | 1493-13-6 |
| 3D model (JSmol) | Interactive image |
| Beilstein Reference | 1812100 |
| ChEBI | CHEBI:48511 |
| ChEMBL | ChEMBL1236265 |
| ChemSpider | 56192 |
| ECHA InfoCard | 100.014.625 |
| EC Number | 216-087-5 |
| Gmelin Reference | 2805 |
| PubChem CID | 62406 |
| UNII | JE2SY203E8 |
| CompTox Dashboard (EPA) | DTXSID70892979 DTXSID2044397, DTXSID70892979 |
- InChI: InChI=1S/CHF3O3S/c2-1(3,4)8(5,6)7/h(H,5,6,7) Key: ITMCEJHCFYSIIV-UHFFFAOYSA-N; InChI=1/CHF3O3S/c2-1(3,4)8(5,6)7/h(H,5,6,7) Key: ITMCEJHCFYSIIV-UHFFFAOYAW
- SMILES: C(F)(F)(F)S(=O)(=O)O

Properties
| Chemical formula | CF_{3}SO_{3}H |
| Molar mass | 150.07121 g/mol |
| Appearance | Colorless liquid |
| Density | 1.696 g/mL |
| Melting point | −40 °C (−40 °F; 233 K) |
| Boiling point | 162 °C (324 °F; 435 K) |
| Solubility in water | 1600 g/L |
| Vapor pressure | 3.2 |
| Acidity (pK_{a}) | −14.7±2.0 |
| Conjugate base | Triflate anion |
| Viscosity | 1.864–1.881 mm^{2}/s at 20 °C |

Hazards
- Occupational safety and health (OHS/OSH)
| Main hazards | Causes severe acid burns |
- GHS labelling
| Pictograms | (GHS05: Corrosive) (GHS07: Exclamation mark) |
| Signal word | Danger |
| Hazard statements | H290, H302, H314, H335, H402 |
| Precautionary statements | P234, P261, P264, P270, P271, P273, P280, P301+P312+P330, P301+P330+P331, P303+P361+P353, P304+P340+P310, P305+P351+P338+P310, P363, P390, P403+P233, P405, P501 |
| NFPA 704 (fire diamond) | 4 0 2 ACID |

Related compounds
| Related compounds | Sulfuric acid; Fluorosulfuric acid; Methanesulfonic acid; Trichloromethanesulfonic acid; Trifluoroacetic acid; Perfluorooctanesulfonic acid; Triflidic acid; Nafion |
- Except where otherwise noted, data are given for materials in their standard state (at 25 °C [77 °F], 100 kPa). verify (what is ?) Infobox references

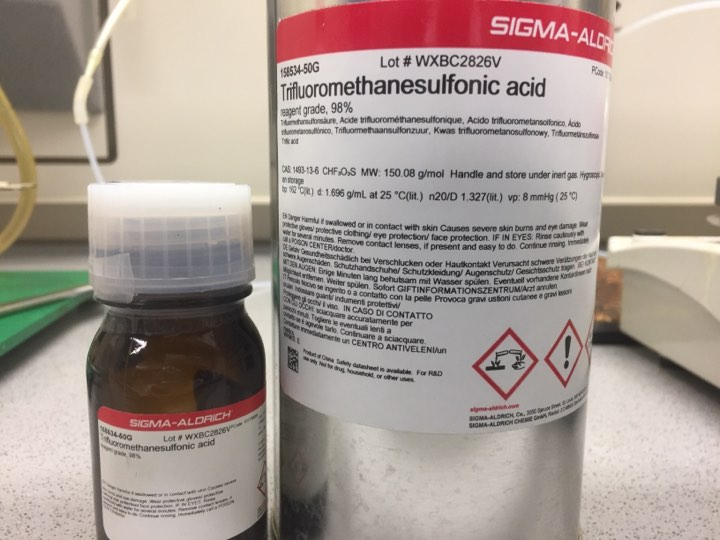
Trifluoromethanesulfonic acid

Triflic acid, the short name for trifluoromethanesulfonic acid, TFMS, TFSA, HOTf or TfOH, is a sulfonic acid with the chemical formula CF_{3}SO_{3}H. It is one of the strongest known acids. Triflic acid is mainly used in research as a catalyst for esterification. It is a hygroscopic, colorless, slightly viscous liquid that is soluble in polar solvents. The acid is also the trifluorinated analogue of trichloromethanesulfonic acid.

== Synthesis ==
Trifluoromethanesulfonic acid is produced industrially by electrochemical fluorination (ECF) of methanesulfonic acid to triflyl fluoride:

CH_{3}SO_{3}H + 4 HF → CF_{3}SO_{2}F + H_{2}O + 3 H_{2}

The acyl fluoride is hydrolyzed, and the resulting triflate salt is heated in sulfuric acid, resulting in the distillation of HOTf. Alternatively, trifluoromethanesulfonic acid arises by oxidation of trifluoromethylsulfenyl chloride:

CF_{3}SCl + 2 Cl_{2} + 3 H_{2}O → CF_{3}SO_{3}H + 5 HCl

Triflic acid is purified by distillation from triflic anhydride.

=== Historical ===
Trifluoromethanesulfonic acid was first synthesized in 1954 by Haszeldine and Kidd by the following reaction:

== Reactions ==
=== As an acid ===
In the laboratory, triflic acid is useful in protonations because the conjugate base of triflic acid is nonnucleophilic. It is also used as an acidic titrant in nonaqueous acid-base titration because it behaves as a strong acid in many solvents (acetonitrile, acetic acid, etc.) where common mineral acids (such as HCl or H_{2}SO_{4}) are only moderately strong.

With a K_{a} = 5×10^{14}, pK_{a} = −14.7±2.0, triflic acid qualifies as a superacid. It owes many of its useful properties to its great thermal and chemical stability. Both the acid and its conjugate base CF_{3}SO^{−}_{3}, known as triflate, resist oxidation/reduction reactions, whereas many strong acids are oxidizing, such as perchloric or nitric acid. Further recommending its use, triflic acid does not sulfonate substrates, which can be a problem with sulfuric acid, fluorosulfuric acid, and chlorosulfonic acid. Below is a prototypical sulfonation, which triflic acid does not undergo:

C_{6}H_{6} + H_{2}SO_{4} → C_{6}H_{5}(SO_{3}H) + H_{2}O in SO_{3}

Triflic acid fumes in moist air and forms a stable solid monohydrate, CF_{3}SO_{3}H·H_{2}O, melting point 34 °C. Both the hydrate and the acid can be distilled with phosphorus pentoxide, yielding triflic anhydride.

=== Salt and complex formation ===
In its coordination complexes, the triflate ligand is labile, reflecting its low basicity. Trifluoromethanesulfonic acid reacts exothermically with metal carbonates, hydroxides, and oxides. Illustrative is the synthesis of Cu(OTf)_{2}.

Cu_{2}CO_{3}(OH)_{2} + 4 CF_{3}SO_{3}H → 2 Cu(O_{3}SCF_{3})_{2} + 3 H_{2}O + CO_{2}

Chloride ligands can be converted to the corresponding triflates:

3 CF_{3}SO_{3}H + [Co(NH_{3})_{5}Cl]Cl_{2} → [Co(NH_{3})_{5}O_{3}SCF_{3}](O_{3}SCF_{3})_{2} + 3 HCl

This conversion is conducted in neat HOTf at 100 °C, followed by precipitation of the salt upon the addition of ether.

=== Organic chemistry ===
Triflic acid reacts with acyl halides to give mixed triflate anhydrides, which are strong acylating agents, e.g. in Friedel–Crafts reactions.

CH_{3}C(O)Cl + CF_{3}SO_{3}H → CH_{3}C(O)OSO_{2}CF_{3} + HCl

CH_{3}C(O)OSO_{2}CF_{3} + C_{6}H_{6} → CH_{3}C(O)C_{6}H_{5} + CF_{3}SO_{3}H

Triflic acid catalyzes the reaction of aromatic compounds with sulfonyl chlorides, probably also through the intermediacy of a mixed anhydride of the sulfonic acid.

Triflic acid promotes other Friedel–Crafts-like reactions including the cracking of alkanes and alkylation of alkenes, which are very important to the petroleum industry. These triflic acid derivative catalysts are very effective in isomerizing straight chain or slightly branched hydrocarbons that can increase the octane rating of a particular petroleum-based fuel.

Triflic acid reacts exothermically with alcohols to produce ethers and olefins.

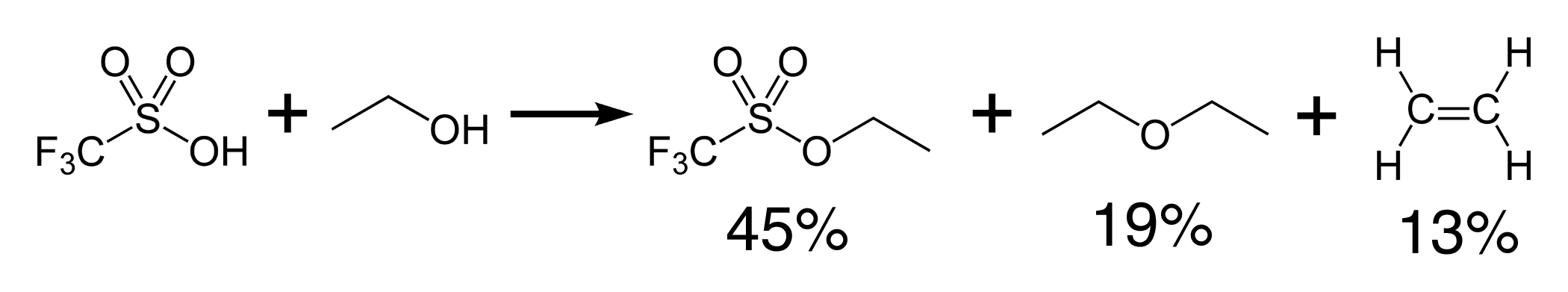
triflic acid condensation reaction

Dehydration gives the acid anhydride, trifluoromethanesulfonic anhydride, (CF_{3}SO_{2})_{2}O.

== Safety ==
Triflic acid is one of the strongest acids. Contact with skin causes severe burns with delayed tissue destruction. On inhalation it causes fatal spasms, inflammation and edema.

Like sulfuric acid, triflic acid must be slowly added to polar solvents to prevent thermal runaway.
