= Bromobenzenes =

Bromobenzenes are a group of aryl bromides/halobenzenes consisting of one or more bromine atoms as substituents on a benzene core. They have the formula C_{6}H_{6–n}Br_{n}, where n = 1–6 is the number of bromine atoms. Depending on the number of bromine substituents, there may be several constitutional isomers possible.

== Isomers ==
- Monobromobenzene
- Dibromobenzene
  - 1,2-Dibromobenzene
  - 1,3-Dibromobenzene
  - 1,4-Dibromobenzene
- Tribromobenzene
  - 1,2,3-Tribromobenzene
  - 1,2,4-Tribromobenzene
  - 1,3,5-Tribromobenzene
- Tetrabromobenzene
  - 1,2,3,4-Tetrabromobenzene
  - 1,2,3,5-Tetrabromobenzene
  - 1,2,4,5-Tetrabromobenzene
- Pentabromobenzene
- Hexabromobenzene

== Preparation ==
Bromobenzenes may be prepared by electrophilic aromatic bromination of benzene and benzene derivatives, using elemental bromine and the Lewis acid catalyst iron(III) bromide. They may also be prepared from diazonium compounds.

== Reactions ==
Bromobenzenes may be carboxylated into carboxylic acids using carbon monoxide. The reaction takes place in a two-phase mixture of p-xylene and water as solvent, in the presence of catalytic PdCl_{2}(NCPh)_{2} and triphenylphosphine (PPh_{3}), tetrabutylammonium iodide (TBAI) as a phase-transfer catalyst, and sodium hydroxide as a base. Below is an example reaction of 1,3-dibromobenzene to isophthalic acid.

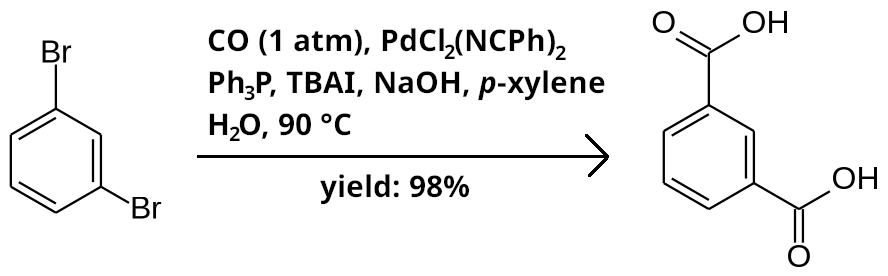

== See also ==
- Fluorobenzenes
- Chlorobenzenes
- Iodobenzenes
