= C6H4Cl2 =

The molecular formula C_{6}H_{4}Cl_{2} (molar mass: 147.00 g/mol) may refer to:

- 1,2-Dichlorobenzene
- 1,3-Dichlorobenzene
- 1,4-Dichlorobenzene
- Dichlorofulvenes
- 1,6-Dichloro-2,4-hexadiyne
