= Halobenzene =

Halobenzenes are a group of aryl halides consisting of a benzene ring with halogen atoms as substituents.

This includes these groups of halobenzenes:

- Fluorobenzenes
- Chlorobenzenes
- Bromobenzenes
- Iodobenzenes

Halobenzene may also refer to any of the monosubstituted halobenzenes:

- Fluorobenzene
- Chlorobenzene
- Bromobenzene
- Iodobenzene
- Astatobenzene

== Mixed halobenzenes ==
Mixed halobenzenes contain two or more types of halogens bonded to the same benzene ring:

- Chlorofluorobenzene
- Bromofluorobenzene
- Fluoroiodobenzene
- Bromochlorobenzene
- Chloroiodobenzene
- Bromoiodobenzene

== List of halobenzene derivatives ==
- Haloanilines
  - Fluoroaniline
  - Chloroaniline
  - Bromoaniline
  - Iodoaniline
- Haloanisoles
  - Fluoroanisole
  - Chloroanisole
  - Bromoanisole
  - Iodoanisole
- Halobenzaldehydes
  - Fluorobenzaldehyde
  - Chlorobenzaldehyde
  - Bromobenzaldehyde
  - Iodobenzaldehyde
- Halobenzoic acids
  - Fluorobenzoic acid
  - Chlorobenzoic acid
  - Bromobenzoic acid
  - Iodobenzoic acid
- Halobenzonitriles
  - Fluorobenzonitrile
  - Chlorobenzonitrile
  - Bromobenzonitrile
  - Iodobenzonitrile
- Halonitrobenzenes
  - Fluoronitrobenzene
  - Chloronitrobenzene
  - Bromonitrobenzene
  - Nitroiodobenzene
- Halophenols
  - Fluorophenol
  - Chlorophenol
  - Bromophenol
  - Iodophenol
- Halostyrenes
  - Fluorostyrene
  - Chlorostyrene
  - Bromostyrene
  - Iodostyrene
- Halotoluenes
  - Fluorotoluene
  - Chlorotoluene
  - Bromotoluene
  - Iodotoluene
