= Chlorobenzenes =

Chlorobenzenes are a group of aryl chlorides/halobenzenes consisting of one or more chlorine atoms as substituents on a benzene core. They have the formula C_{6}H_{6–n}Cl_{n}, where n = 1–6 is the number of chlorine atoms. Depending on the number of chlorine substituents, there may be several constitutional isomers possible.

- Monochlorobenzene
- Dichlorobenzene
  - 1,2-Dichlorobenzene
  - 1,3-Dichlorobenzene
  - 1,4-Dichlorobenzene
- Trichlorobenzene
  - 1,2,3-Trichlorobenzene
  - 1,2,4-Trichlorobenzene
  - 1,3,5-Trichlorobenzene
- Tetrachlorobenzene
  - 1,2,3,4-Tetrachlorobenzene
  - 1,2,3,5-Tetrachlorobenzene
  - 1,2,4,5-Tetrachlorobenzene
- Pentachlorobenzene
- Hexachlorobenzene

== See also ==
- Fluorobenzenes
- Bromobenzenes
- Iodobenzenes
