= Phenine nanotube =

A phenine nanotube is a derivation or variant of short carbon nanotubes first reported in 2019. Similar to carbon nanotubes, they possess a cylindrical structure, with they key difference being the replacement of trigonal sp^{2}-hybridized carbon atoms with 1,3,5-trisubstituted benzene (phenine) units.

They have a precise cylindrical structure with pores and a length index of 7. They have been synthesized by a 9-step process starting with 1,3-dibromobenzene, which involves several borylation and coupling steps. A variant that is doped with nitrogen has also been synthesized, and has been reported to display properties similar to an organic n-type semiconductor.

Some advantages that phenine nanotubes possess over carbon nanotubes include a greater length and more flexible sidewalls, and greater porosity. However, they also possess significantly lower values of the Young's modulus and tensile strength.

== See also ==
- Carbon nanotube
