= Fluorobenzenes =

Fluorobenzenes are a group of aryl fluorides/halobenzenes consisting of one or more fluorine atoms as substituents on a benzene core. They have the formula C_{6}H_{6–n}F_{n}, where n = 1–6 is the number of fluorine atoms. Depending on the number of fluorine substituents, there may be several constitutional isomers possible.

- Monofluorobenzene
- Difluorobenzene
  - 1,2-Difluorobenzene
  - 1,3-Difluorobenzene
  - 1,4-Difluorobenzene
- Trifluorobenzene
  - 1,2,3-Trifluorobenzene
  - 1,2,4-Trifluorobenzene
  - 1,3,5-Trifluorobenzene
- Tetrafluorobenzene
  - 1,2,3,4-Tetrafluorobenzene
  - 1,2,3,5-Tetrafluorobenzene
  - 1,2,4,5-Tetrafluorobenzene
- Pentafluorobenzene
- Hexafluorobenzene

== See also ==
- Chlorobenzenes
- Bromobenzenes
- Iodobenzenes
