= Hazardous substances in cultural heritage collections =

Cultural heritage collections contain many materials known to be hazardous to the environment and to human health. Some hazardous substances may be an integral part of the object (such as a toxic paint pigment or a naturally radioactive mineral sample), applied as a treatment after the object was made (such as a pesticide) or the result of material degradation (such as the exudation of plasticiser from polyvinyl chloride). The toxicity of such objects in heritage collections can also determine their historic and scientific value. Consequently, management of these materials within collecting organisations can be complex in terms of health and safety.

These substances represent a hazard for people working with or using affected collections items as well as acting as a record of the use of these materials over time. Disposal or removal of hazardous substances from cultural collections can be expensive and logistically challenging.

Many of the hazardous substances found in cultural heritage collections may also be classified as Dangerous Goods or Scheduled Poisons and subject to strict regulations concerning their sale, storage, labelling, handling, transport, display and disposal.

== Asbestos ==
Asbestos was used widely as a fire-proof or fire-suppressing agent, in scientific, industrial and domestic appliances, clothing, and tools. Asbestos can also be found mixed with cements and resins and woven into fabrics. Asbestos-containing mineral samples may be present in natural history collections. The safe management of asbestos is highly regulated in most countries, e.g. the UK Control of Asbestos Regulations 2012.

== Corrosives ==
Acids and alkalis can be found in industrial chemicals (e.g. photographic developing agents), as the preservative used for fluid-preserved natural history specimens (formalin) and in batteries.

== Heavy metals (lead, mercury, arsenic, etc.) ==
Lead is a soft, malleable metal that has been used for a variety of purposes throughout history: as food additives, paint pigments, or solder, and to make pewter drinking vessels and lead toys.

Mercury can be found in scientific equipment such as thermometers, and as a residue on animal skins, furs, and hats where it was used in the preparation process. Mercuric chloride was also used as a pesticide or biocide.

Arsenic and mercury are a common hazardous substance found in historic dress and textile collections from the 18th and 19th centuries as it was used in textile dyes e.g. Scheele's Green a yellow-green pigment, and textile manufacture, hat making.

== Mould and micro-organisms ==
Mould and micro-organisms (e.g. bacteria) may be present on the surface of collection objects, particularly those that have been stored in warm and damp conditions.

== Paints, pigments and dyes ==
Many toxic pigments and other paint ingredients have been used, many since antiquity. Toxic pigments include lead, mercury, cadmium, cobalt, antimony and arsenic.

== Pesticides and herbicides ==
Museum collections can contain samples of actual pesticides and herbicides (such as mercuric chloride, paradichlorobenzene and DDT) as well as artefacts that have been treated with pesticides to prevent infestations by museum personnel and field collectors especially over the 18th century to the end of the 20th century as "[…] such treatments were traditionally thought to be part of general collections maintenance."

The latter can prevent access to collection items unless the chemical residues can be removed or safely managed, as there are also human health implications associated with most pesticides.

Once a commonplace treatment for objects made of organic materials (e.g. animal and insect specimens, woollen clothing, objects containing plant fibres, fur and feathers), use of pesticides has substantially diminished with the development of integrated pest management as a collection management strategy.

Naphthalene is one of the most commonly encountered pesticide residues found on museum collections. As a volatile substance, it can sublimate and recrystallise on surfaces nearby.

Mercury-based pesticides (such as mercuric chloride) can release mercury vapour, which can contaminate other collection objects and surfaces nearby. Monitoring vapour levels has shown that venting closed storage cabinets before use lowers airborne concentration limits to safe limits. Other mitigation strategies include enclosing affected collection objects inside enclosures made from gas vapour barriers and using vented cabinets instead of sealed cabinets for storage.

== Plastics and plasticisers ==
Some deteriorating plastics may generate acidic byproducts (such as acetic acid from cellulose acetate film or nitric acid from cellulose nitrate film), which pose risk to those handling affected objects. Others leach plasticisers, such as the phthalates released from polyvinyl chloride or biphenyl A (BPA).

== Pharmaceuticals, poisons and drugs ==
Many museums contain collections of old medicines and poisons, containing substances which - though once intended to heal - may contains substances hazardous to humans and to the environment. For these reasons pharmacy and prescription-only medicines in museum collections may be subject to local regulations for storage and display.

== Radiation ==
Radioactive minerals may be found in mineralogy, palaeontology, and maritime collections, in radioactive paints on watch faces and aircraft dials, in medical and analytical equipment. Radiation in museum collections must usually be strictly controlled in accordance with local regulations.

== Solvents and chemicals ==
A variety of chemicals can be found in cultural heritage collections, including oxidising agents, flammable and combustible liquids, and other solvents with known toxic, carcinogenic or other health effects. Ethanol and formalin are used to preserve specimens in natural history collections. Petroleum products may be found in industrial heritage collections. Organic solvents may also be found within cosmetics, medicines, and photographic processing chemicals.

== Zoonotics ==
Zoonotic diseases (those transmitted from animals to humans) may be present in natural history specimens or museum objects made with unprocessed animal products.
