= Tetrachlorobenzene =

- 1,2,3,4-Tetrachlorobenzene

- 1,2,3,5-Tetrachlorobenzene

- 1,2,4,5-Tetrachlorobenzene

Identifiers
CAS Number	mix: 12408-10-5; 1,2,4,5: 95-94-3; 1,2,3,5: 634-90-2; 1,2,3,4: 634-66-2
3D model (JSmol)	1,2,4,5: Interactive image; 1,2,3,5: Interactive image; 1,2,3,4: Interactive image
ChEBI	1,2,4,5: CHEBI:36697; 1,2,3,5: CHEBI:36696; 1,2,3,4: CHEBI:18855
ChEMBL	1,2,4,5: ChEMBL45428; 1,2,3,5: ChEMBL44011; 1,2,3,4: ChEMBL46422
ChemSpider	1,2,4,5: 21106163; 1,2,3,5: 21106571; 1,2,3,4: 21106540
ECHA InfoCard	100.032.390
EC Number	1,2,4,5: 202-466-2; 1,2,3,5: 211-217-7; 1,2,3,4: 211-214-0
KEGG	1,2,3,4: C18236
PubChem CID	1,2,4,5: 7270; 1,2,3,5: 12468; 1,2,3,4: 12463
RTECS number	1,2,4,5: DB9450000
UNII	1,2,4,5: 5N27529KGH; 1,2,3,5: I27N186CIN; 1,2,3,4: MH0UY3V1KE
CompTox Dashboard (EPA)	1,2,4,5: DTXSID7024320; 1,2,3,5: DTXSID1026089; 1,2,3,4: DTXSID6026088
- InChI: 1,2,4,5: InChI=1S/C6H2Cl4/c7-3-1-4(8)6(10)2-5(3)9/h1-2H Key: JHBKHLUZVFWLAG-UHFFFAOYSA-N; 1,2,3,5: InChI=1S/C6H2Cl4/c7-3-1-4(8)6(10)5(9)2-3/h1-2H Key: QZYNWJQFTJXIRN-UHFFFAOYSA-N; 1,2,3,4: InChI=1S/C6H2Cl4/c7-3-1-2-4(8)6(10)5(3)9/h1-2H Key: GBDZXPJXOMHESU-UHFFFAOYSA-N
- SMILES: 1,2,4,5: C1=C(C(=CC(=C1Cl)Cl)Cl)Cl; 1,2,3,5: C1=C(C=C(C(=C1Cl)Cl)Cl)Cl; 1,2,3,4: C1=CC(=C(C(=C1Cl)Cl)Cl)Cl

Properties
Chemical formula	C_{6}H_{2}Cl_{4}
Molar mass	215.88 g·mol^{−1}
- Except where otherwise noted, data are given for materials in their standard state (at 25 °C [77 °F], 100 kPa). Infobox references

Tetrachlorobenzene is any of three isomeric chlorobenzenes with the molecular formula C_{6}H_{2}Cl_{4}. They differ by the positions of the chlorine atoms around the ring. Tetrachlorobenzenes are colorless crystalline compounds.

== Properties ==
Selected Physical Properties of Individual Isomers
isomer	m.p. (°C)	b.p. (°C)	m.p. (g/cm^{3} @100 °C)
1,2,3,4	47	254	1.539
1,2,3,5	51.5	246	1.523
1,2,4,5	141	245	1.454

== Synthesis ==
1,2,4,5-Tetrachlorobenzene can be produced by electrophilic halogenation of benzenes and some chlorobenzenes. 1,2,3,4-Tetrachlorobenzene can only be produced by chlorination of 1,3,5-trichlorobenzene.

== Uses ==
1,2,4,5-Tetrachlorobenzene once was used in the production of the herbicide 2,4,5-trichlorophenoxyacetic acid. This method has been discontinued because it produced highly toxic 2,3,7,8-tetrachlorodibenzo-p-dioxin as a waste product.

== See also ==
- Tetrabromobenzene
- Tetraiodobenzene
