= 1,4-Dichlorobenzene =

Structural formula of 1,4-Dichlorobenzene
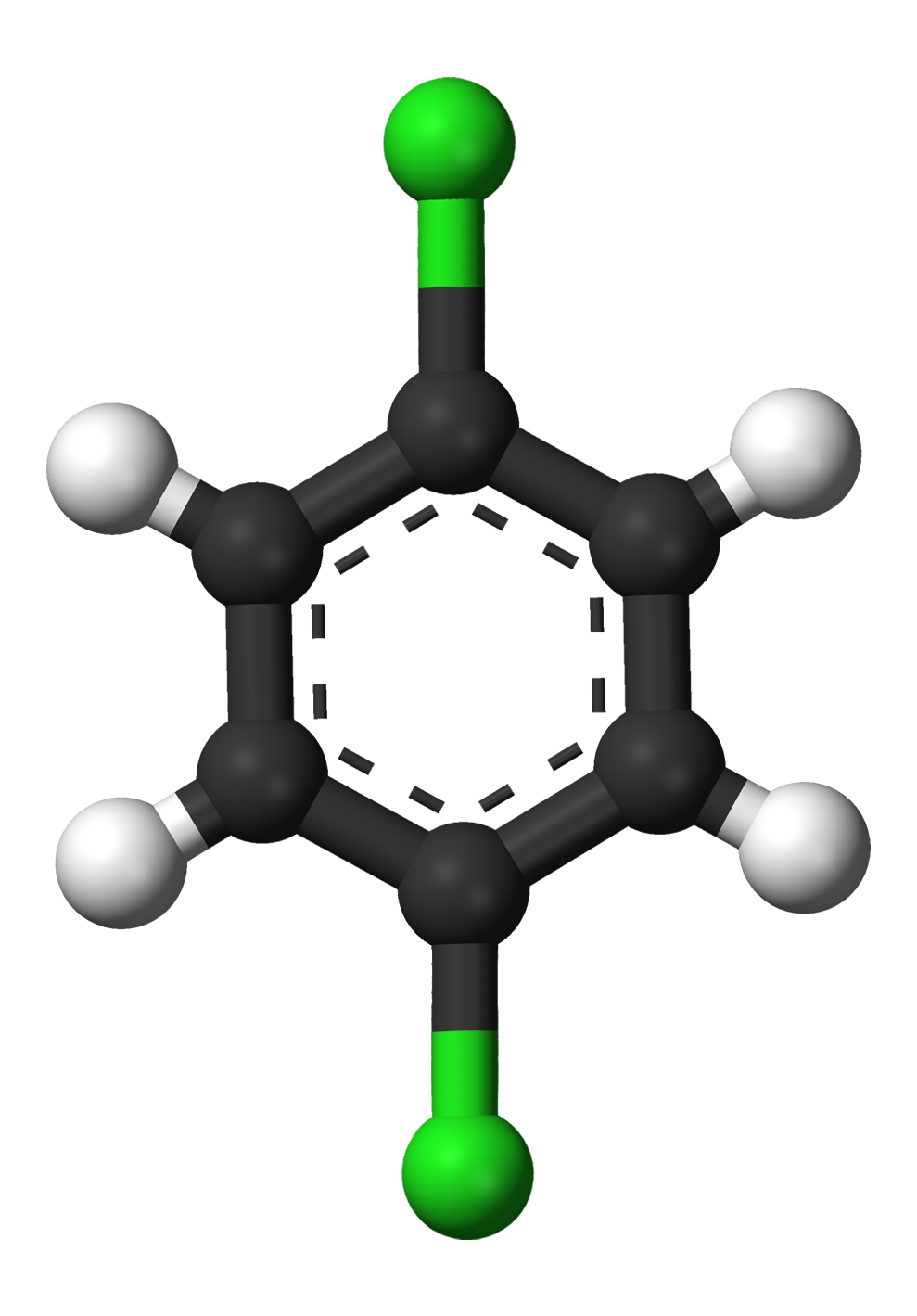
Ball-and-stick model of 1,4-dichlorobenzene
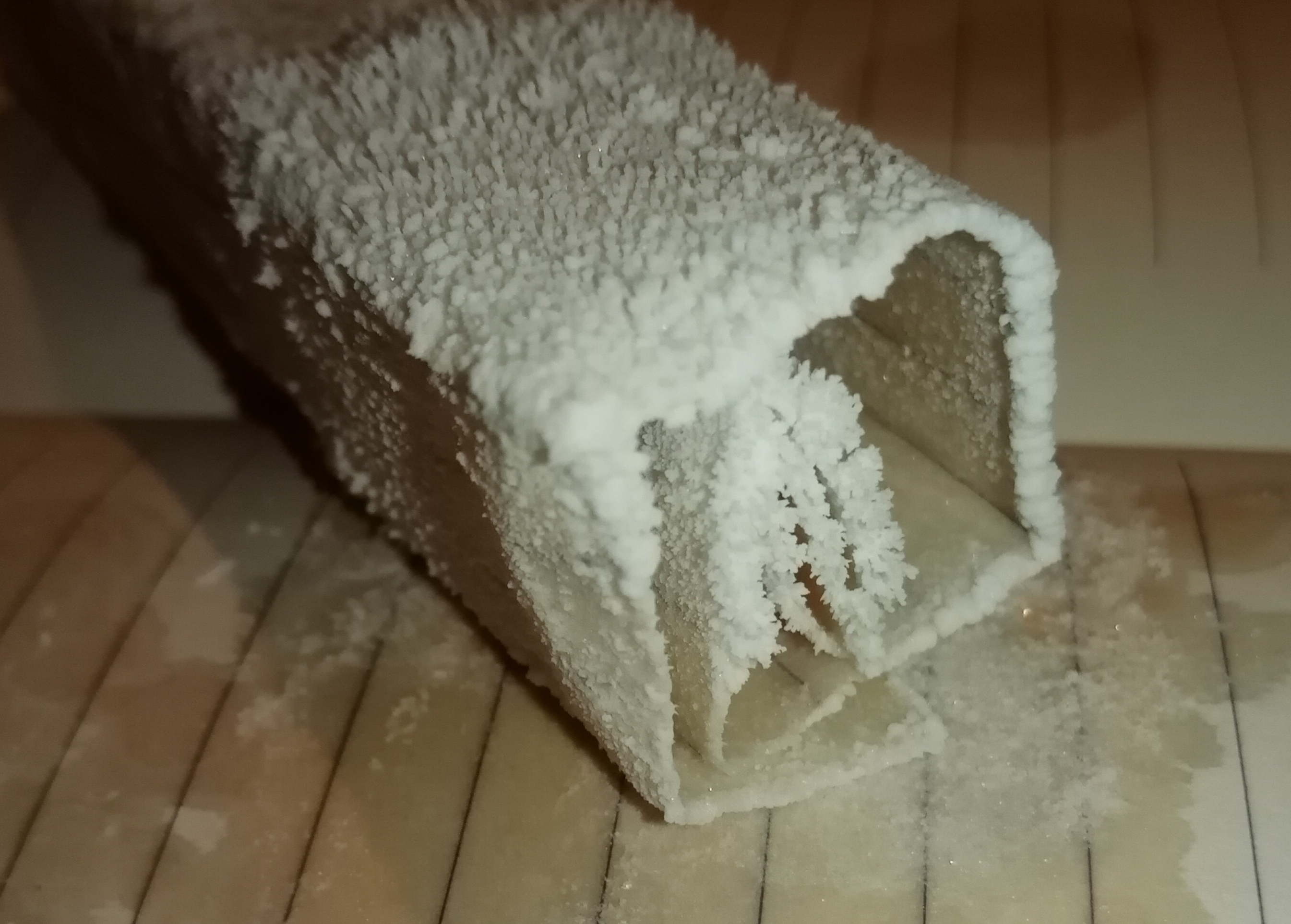
- 1,4-dichlorobenzene crystallised on paper from DCM solution

Names
- Preferred IUPAC name 1,4-Dichlorobenzene
- Other names 1,4-DCB para-Dichlorobenzene p-Dichlorobenzene p-DCB; PDCB; Paramoth; Para crystals Paracide; Dichlorocide

Identifiers
CAS Number	106-46-7
3D model (JSmol)	Interactive image
Abbreviations	p-DCB; 1,4-DCB; PDCB
Beilstein Reference	1680023
ChEBI	CHEBI:28618
ChEMBL	ChEMBL190982
ChemSpider	13866817
ECHA InfoCard	100.003.092
EC Number	203-400-5
Gmelin Reference	49722
KEGG	C07092
PubChem CID	4685
RTECS number	CZ4550000
UNII	D149TYB5MK
UN number	3077
CompTox Dashboard (EPA)	DTXSID1020431
- InChI: InChI=1S/C6H4Cl2/c7-5-1-2-6(8)4-3-5/h1-4H Key: OCJBOOLMMGQPQU-UHFFFAOYSA-N
- SMILES: ClC1=CC=C(Cl)C=C1

Properties
Chemical formula	C_{6}H_{4}Cl_{2}
Molar mass	147.00 g·mol^{−1}
Appearance	Colorless/white crystals
Odor	sweet, mothball-like
Density	1.25 g/cm^{3}, solid
Melting point	53.5 °C (128.3 °F; 326.6 K)
Boiling point	174 °C (345 °F; 447 K)
Solubility in water	10.5 mg/100 mL (20 °C)
Vapor pressure	1.3 mmHg (20 °C)
Magnetic susceptibility (χ)	−82.93·10^{−6} cm^{3}/mol

Hazards
- Occupational safety and health (OHS/OSH)
Main hazards	Suspected carcinogen
- GHS labelling
Pictograms	(GHS07: Exclamation mark) (GHS08: Health hazard) (GHS09: Environmental hazard) (GHS02: Flammable)
Signal word	Warning
Hazard statements	H302, H315, H317, H319, H332, H335, H351, H410
Precautionary statements	P201, P202, P261, P264, P270, P271, P272, P273, P280, P281, P301+P312, P302+P352, P304+P312, P304+P340, P305+P351+P338, P308+P313, P312, P321, P330, P332+P313, P333+P313, P337+P313, P362, P363, P391, P403+P233, P405, P501
NFPA 704 (fire diamond)	2 2 0
Flash point	66 °C (151 °F; 339 K)
Explosive limits	2.5%-?
- Lethal dose or concentration (LD, LC)
LD_{50} (median dose)	500 mg/kg (rat, oral); 2950 mg/kg (mouse, oral); 2512 mg/kg (rat, oral); 2830 mg/kg (rabbit, oral)
LD_{Lo} (lowest published)	857 mg/kg (human, oral); 4000 mg/kg (rat, oral); 2800 mg/kg (guinea pig, oral)
- NIOSH (US health exposure limits)
PEL (Permissible)	TWA 75 ppm (450 mg/m^{3})
REL (Recommended)	Ca
IDLH (Immediate danger)	Ca [150 ppm]

Related compounds
Related compounds	1,2-Dichlorobenzene; 1,3-Dichlorobenzene
- Except where otherwise noted, data are given for materials in their standard state (at 25 °C [77 °F], 100 kPa). verify (what is ?) Infobox references

1,4-Dichlorobenzene (1,4-DCB, p-DCB, or para-dichlorobenzene, sometimes abbreviated as PDCB or para) is an aryl chloride and isomer of dichlorobenzene with the formula C_{6}H_{4}Cl_{2}. This colorless solid has a strong sweet odor reminiscent of mothballs. The molecule consists of a benzene ring with two chlorine atoms (replacing hydrogen atoms) on opposing sites of the ring.

It is used as a disinfectant, pesticide, and deodorant, most familiarly in mothballs in which it is a replacement for the more traditional naphthalene because of naphthalene's greater flammability (though both chemicals have the same NFPA 704 rating). It is also used as a precursor in the production of the chemically and thermally resistant polymer poly(p-phenylene sulfide).

== Production ==
p-DCB is produced by chlorination of benzene using ferric chloride as a catalyst:

C_{6}H_{6} + 2 Cl_{2} → C_{6}H_{4}Cl_{2} + 2 HCl

The chief impurity is the 1,2 isomer. The compound can be purified by fractional crystallization, taking advantage of its relatively high melting point of 53.5 °C; the isomeric dichlorobenzenes and chlorobenzene melt well below room temperature.

== Uses ==
=== Disinfectant, deodorant, and pesticide ===
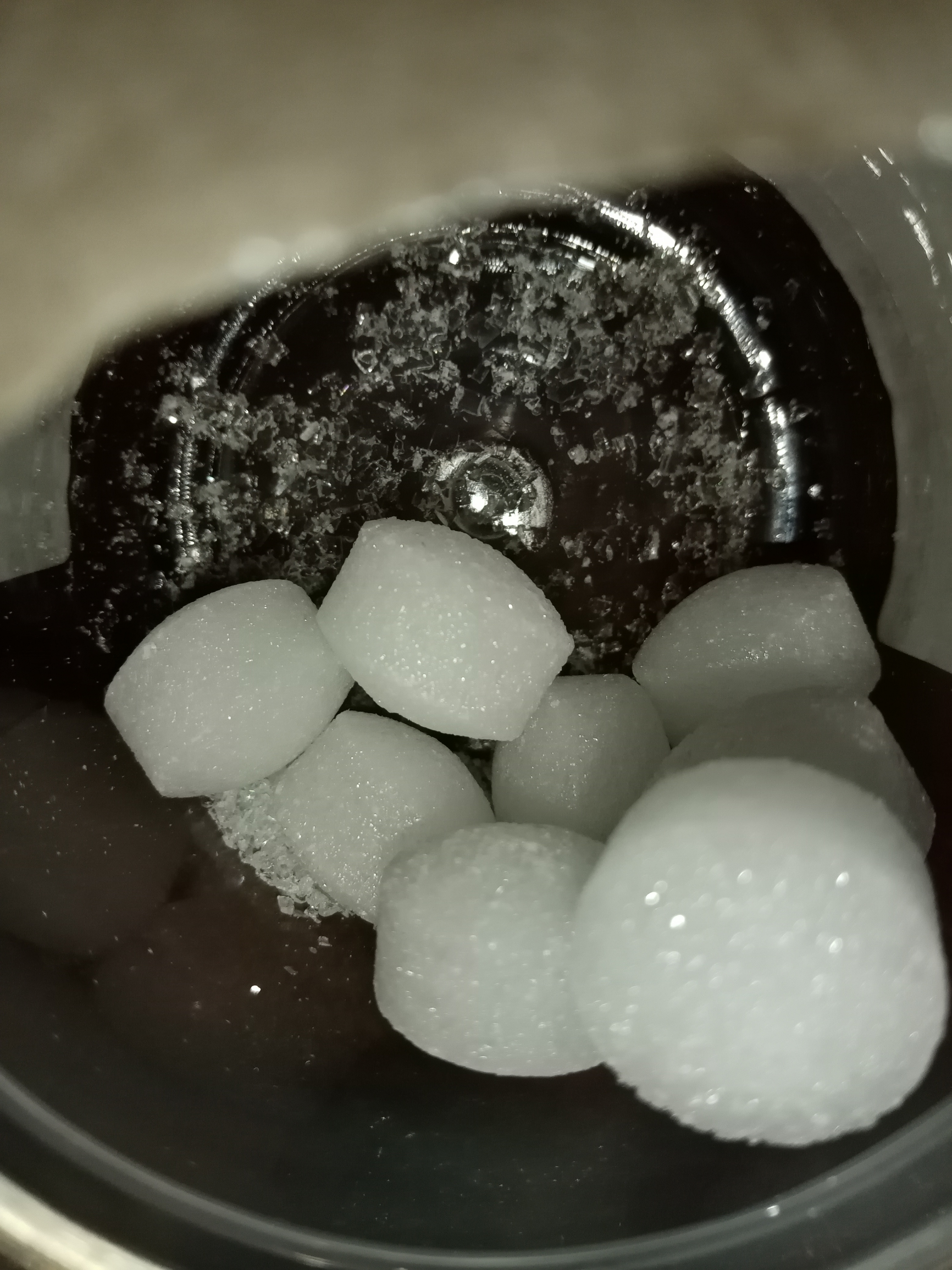
1,4-dichlorobenzene balls sold as urinal disinfectant

p-DCB is used to control moths, molds, and mildew. It also finds use as a disinfectant in waste containers and restrooms and is the characteristic smell associated with urinal cakes. Its usefulness for these applications arises from p-DCB's low solubility in water and its relatively high volatility: it sublimes readily near room temperature.

=== Precursor to other chemicals ===
Nitration gives 1,4-dichloronitrobenzene, a precursor to commercial dyes and pigments. The chloride sites on p-DCB can be substituted with hydroxylamine and sulfide groups. In a growing application, p-DCB is the precursor to the high performance polymer poly(p-phenylene sulfide):

=== As ceruminolytic agent ===
2% Paradichlorobenzene used as a ceruminolytic agent for the treatment of impacted earwax.

=== Recreational Use ===
Recreational abuse of PDCB has been described, usually through use of urinal cakes. It is typically huffed. Deaths have been recorded from abuse.

== Environmental and health effects ==
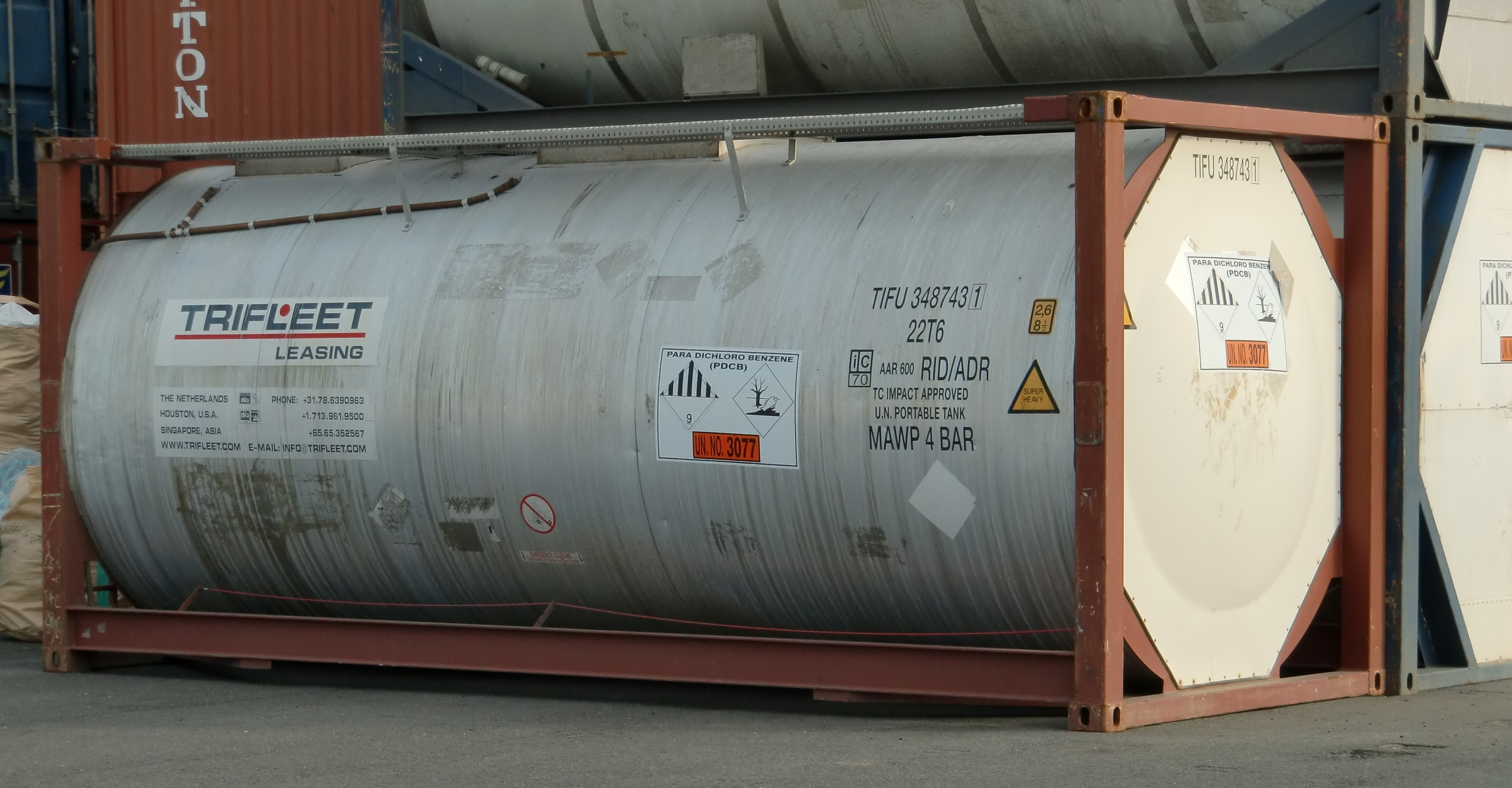
Shipping container of the substance, showing several hazard labels confirming the environmental hazard posed by the substance.

p-DCB is poorly soluble in water and is not easily broken down by soil organisms. Like many hydrocarbons, p-DCB is lipophilic and will accumulate in fatty tissues if consumed by a person or animal.

The United States Department of Health and Human Services (DHHS) and the International Agency for Research on Cancer (IARC) have determined that p-DCB may reasonably be anticipated to be a carcinogen. This has been indicated by animal studies, although a full-scale human study has not been done.

The United States Environmental Protection Agency (EPA) has set a target maximum contaminant level of 75 micrograms of p-DCB per liter of drinking water (75 μg/L), but publishes no information on the cancer risk. p-DCB is also an EPA-registered pesticide. The United States Occupational Safety and Health Administration (OSHA) has set a maximum level of 75 parts of p-DCB per million parts air in the workplace (75 ppm) for an 8-hour day, 40-hour workweek.

A mechanism for the carcinogenic effects of mothballs and some types of air fresheners containing p-DCB has been identified in roundworms.

Due to its carcinogenic nature, use of paradichlorobenzene in the European Union is forbidden as an air freshener (since 2005) and in mothballs (since 2008).

=== Biodegradation ===
Rhodococcus phenolicus is a bacterium species able to degrade dichlorobenzene as its sole carbon source.

== See also ==
- Air freshener
- Camphor
- Mothball
