= Tetraiodobenzene =

Tetraiodobenzenes form a group of iodobenzenes with four iodine atoms as substituents (C_{6}H_{2}I_{4}). By their different arrangement, three constitutional isomers are possible.

Tetraiodobenzenes
Name	1,2,3,4-Tetraiodobenzene	1,2,3,5-Tetraiodobenzene	1,2,4,5-Tetraiodobenzene
Structural formula	Structural formula of 1,2,3,4-Tetraiodobenzene	Structural formula of 1,2,3,5-Tetraiodobenzene	Structural formula of 1,2,4,5-Tetraiodobenzene
CAS number	634-68-4	634-92-4	636-31-7
PubChem	CID 12465 from PubChem	CID 12470 from PubChem	CID 12488 from PubChem
Sum formula	C_{6}H_{2}I_{4}		
Molar mass	581,70 g·mol^{−1}		
Physical condition	solid		
Appearance			white needles
Melting point	136 °C	148 °C	249–252 °C

== See also ==
- Tetrachlorobenzene
- Tetrabromobenzene
