= 1-Bromo-4-iodobenzene =

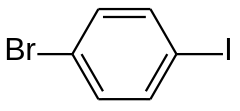

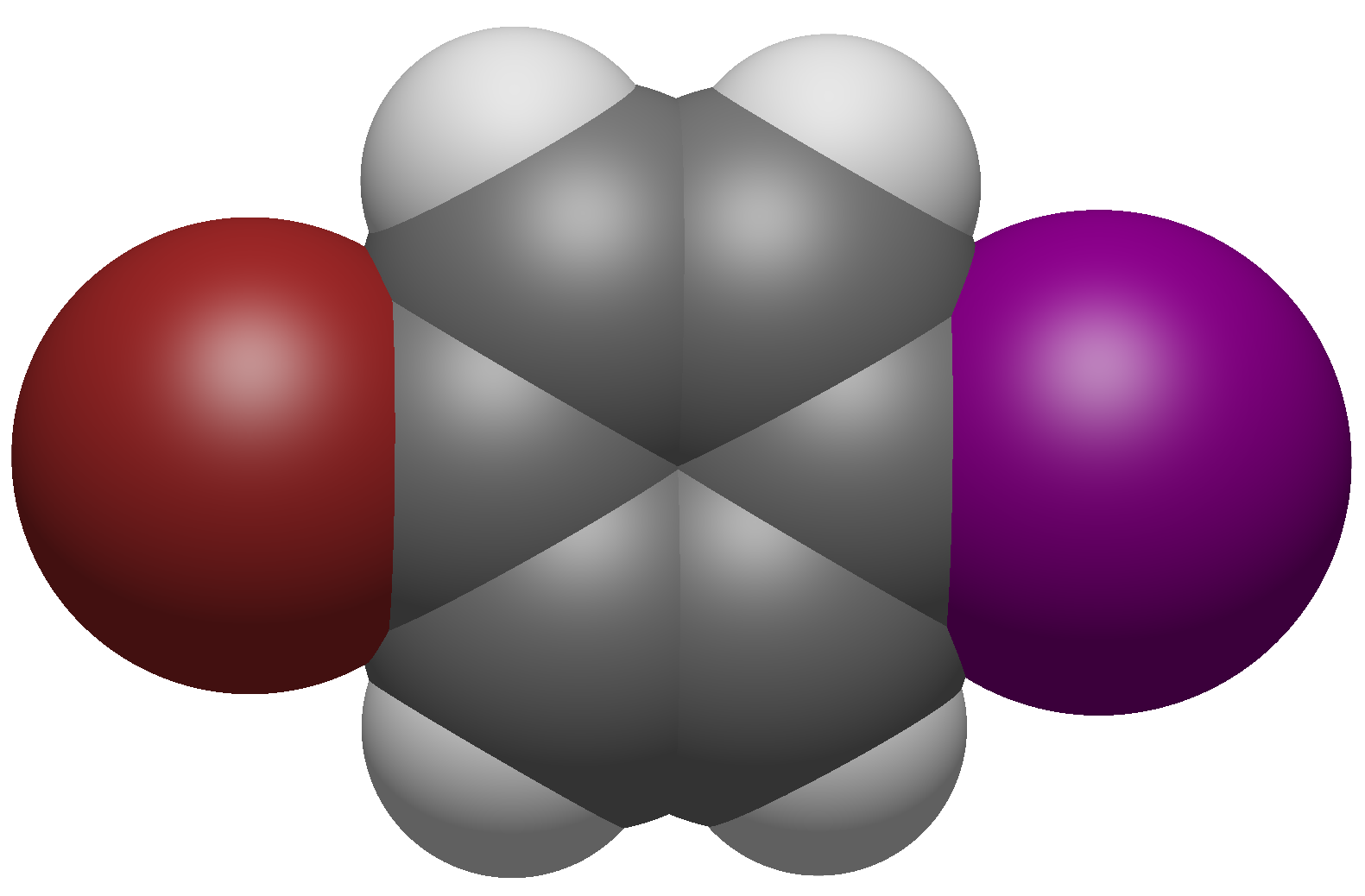

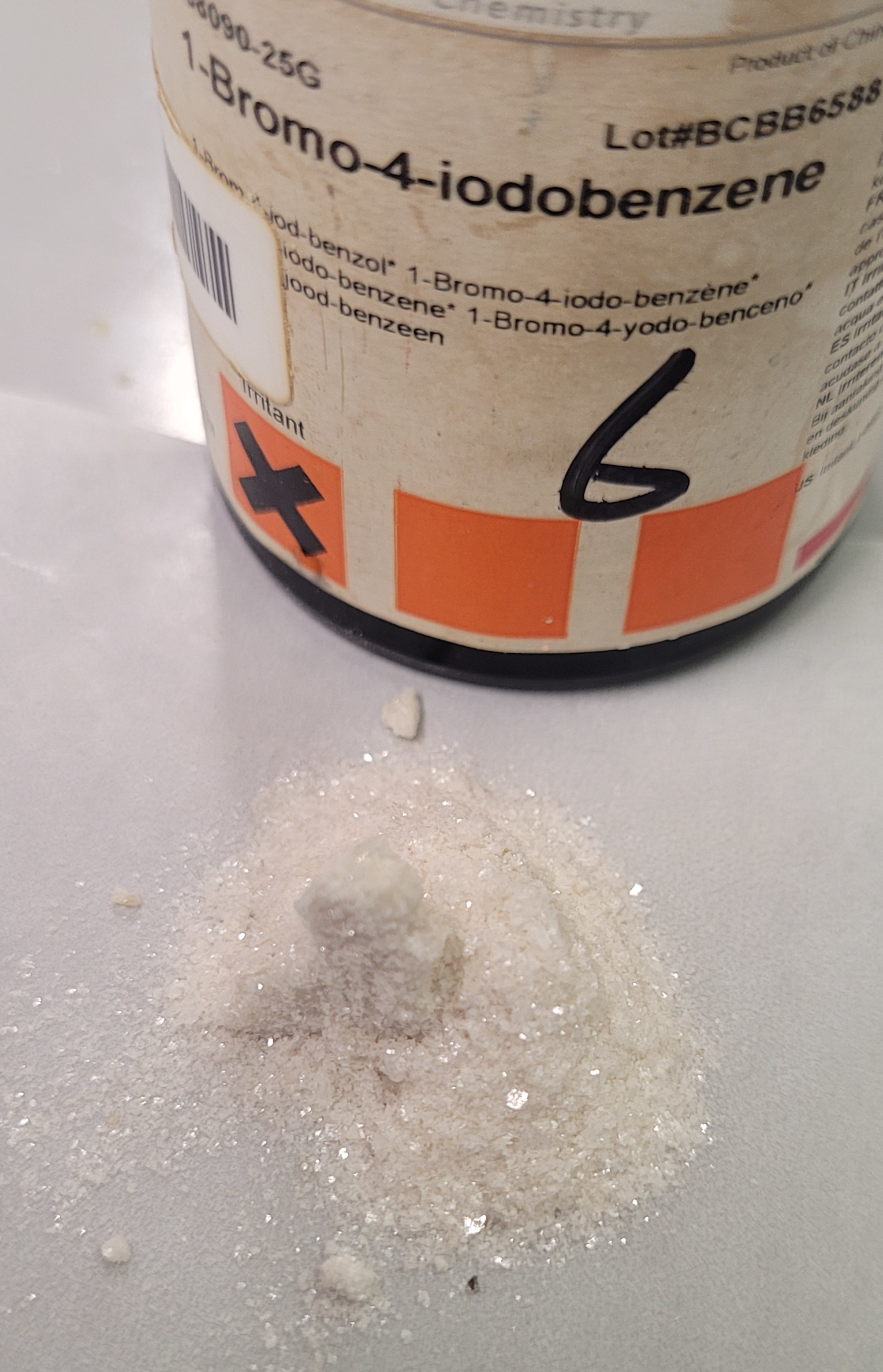

Names
- Preferred IUPAC name 1-Bromo-4-iodobenzene
- Other names p-Bromoiodobenzene

Identifiers
CAS Number	589-87-7
3D model (JSmol)	Interactive image
ChemSpider	11038
ECHA InfoCard	100.008.785
EC Number	209-662-7
PubChem CID	11522
UNII	R9LDG2XS7C
CompTox Dashboard (EPA)	DTXSID5060433
- InChI: InChI=InChI = 1S/C6H4BrI/c7-5-1-3-6(8)4-2-5/h1-4H Key: UCCUXODGPMAHRL-UHFFFAOYSA-N
- SMILES: C1=CC(=CC=C1Br)I

Properties
Chemical formula	C_{6}H_{4}BrI
Molar mass	282.90 g/mol
Appearance	colorless solid
Melting point	91 °C (196 °F; 364 K)

Related compounds
Related compounds	1,4-Dibromobenzene
- Except where otherwise noted, data are given for materials in their standard state (at 25 °C [77 °F], 100 kPa). Infobox references

1-Bromo-4-iodobenzene is a mixed aryl halide (aryl bromide and aryl iodide) with the formula BrC_{6}H_{4}I.

== Preparation ==
In one laboratory route to 1-bromo-4-iodobenzene, 4-bromoaniline is treated with concentrated sulfuric acid and sodium nitrite to form the diazonium salt, which is then treated with potassium iodide to form 1-bromo-4-iodobenzene.

== Reactions ==
Since aryl iodides are more reactive than aryl bromides in the Sonogashira coupling, the iodine end of 1-bromo-4-iodobenzene can be selectively coupled to a terminal acetylene while leaving the bromine end unreacted, by running the reaction at room temperature. For example, two equivalents of 1-bromo-4-iodobenzene can couple to trimethylsilylacetylene in a room temperature symmetrical Sonogashira coupling (with TMSA being deprotected to acetylene in-situ) to form bis(4-bromophenyl)acetylene.

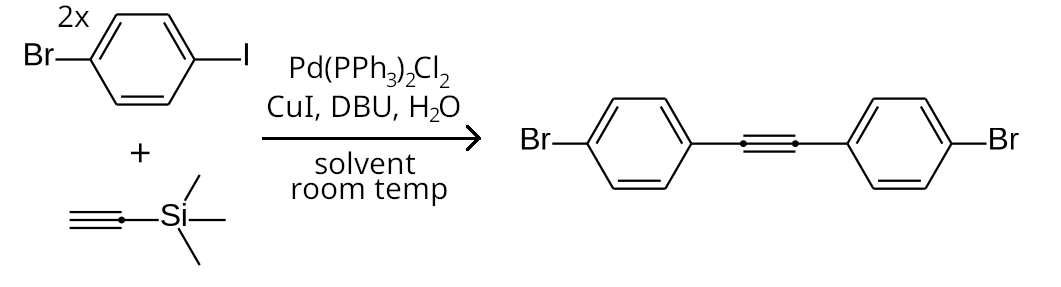

== See also ==
- Bromobenzene
- Iodobenzene
- Bromochlorobenzene
