= Iodobenzenes =

Iodobenzenes are a group of aryl iodides/halobenzenes consisting of one or more iodine atoms as substituents on a benzene core. They have the formula C_{6}H_{6–n}I_{n}, where n = 1–6 is the number of iodine atoms. Depending on the number of iodine substituents, there may be several constitutional isomers possible.

- Monoiodobenzene
- Diiodobenzene
  - 1,2-Diiodobenzene
  - 1,3-Diiodobenzene
  - 1,4-Diiodobenzene
- Triiodobenzene
  - 1,2,3-Triiodobenzene
  - 1,2,4-Triiodobenzene
  - 1,3,5-Triiodobenzene
- Tetraiodobenzene
  - 1,2,3,4-Tetraiodobenzene
  - 1,2,3,5-Tetraiodobenzene
  - 1,2,4,5-Tetraiodobenzene
- Pentaiodobenzene
- Hexaiodobenzene

== See also ==
- Fluorobenzenes
- Chlorobenzenes
- Bromobenzenes
