= Bromochlorobenzene =

Bromochlorobenzenes are mixed aryl halides (aryl chloride and aryl bromide) consisting bromine and chlorine as substituents on a benzene ring.

Isomers of Bromochlorobenzene
Skeletal formula
General
Common names	o-bromochlorobenzene ortho-bromochlorobenzene	m-bromochlorobenzene meta-bromochlorobenzene	p-bromochlorobenzene para-bromochlorobenzene
Systematic name	1-bromo-2-chlorobenzene	1-bromo-3-chlorobenzene	1-bromo-4-chlorobenzene
Molecular formula	BrC_{6}H_{4}Cl
Molar mass	191.45 g/mol
CAS number	694-80-4	108-37-2	106-39-8
ChemSpider	12230	13875377	7518
PubChem CID	12754	7928	7806
Properties
Melting point	−13 °C (260 K)	−22 °C (251 K)	63–67 °C (336–340 K)
Boiling point	203–205 °C (476–478 K)	195–196 °C (468–469 K)	196 °C (469 K)

All three have been synthesized by various routes:

- 1-Bromo-2-chlorobenzene: from 2-chloroaniline, via diazotization followed by a Sandmeyer reaction
- 1-Bromo-3-chlorobenzene: by (3-chlorophenyl)trimethylgermanium by electrophilic substitution
- 1-Bromo-4-chlorobenzene:
  - From a derivative of (4-bromophenyl)silane using N-bromosuccinimide
  - From 4-chlorophenol using triphenylphosphine dibromide or phenylphosphorus tetrachloride

== See also ==
- Bromoiodobenzene
