= 1,2-Dibromobenzene =

Names
- Preferred IUPAC name 1,2-Dibromobenzene
- Other names o-Dibromobenzene

Identifiers
CAS Number	583-53-9
3D model (JSmol)	Interactive image
Beilstein Reference	970241
ChEBI	CHEBI:37152
ChEMBL	ChEMBL1797135
ChemSpider	13875212
ECHA InfoCard	100.008.645
EC Number	209-507-3
Gmelin Reference	130950
PubChem CID	11414
UNII	52K9W7U6EH
UN number	2711
CompTox Dashboard (EPA)	DTXSID0022064
- InChI: InChI=1S/C6H4Br2/c7-5-3-1-2-4-6(5)8/h1-4H Key: WQONPSCCEXUXTQ-UHFFFAOYSA-N
- SMILES: C1=CC=C(C(=C1)Br)Br

Properties
Chemical formula	C_{6}H_{4}Br_{2}
Molar mass	235.906 g·mol^{−1}
Appearance	colorless liquid
Density	1.9940 g/cm^{3}
Melting point	7.1 °C (44.8 °F; 280.2 K)
Boiling point	225 °C (437 °F; 498 K)

Hazards
- GHS labelling
Pictograms	(GHS07: Exclamation mark)
Signal word	Warning
Hazard statements	H315, H319, H335
Precautionary statements	P261, P264, P271, P280, P302+P352, P304+P340, P305+P351+P338, P312, P321, P332+P313, P337+P313, P362, P403+P233, P405, P501

Related compounds
Related compounds	1,3-Dibromobenzene; 1,4-Dibromobenzene; 1,2-Dichlorobenzene
- Except where otherwise noted, data are given for materials in their standard state (at 25 °C [77 °F], 100 kPa). Infobox references

1,2-Dibromobenzene (o-dibromobenzene) is an aryl bromide and isomer of dibromobenzene. It is one of three isomers, the others being 1,3- and 1,4-dibromobenzene. It is a colorless liquid, although impure samples appear yellowish. The compound is a precursor to many 1,2-disubstituted derivatives of benzene. For example, it is a precursor to 1,2-dicyanobenzene and dithioethers.

== See also ==
- 1,3-Dibromobenzene
- 1,4-Dibromobenzene
