= Toilet rim block =

Blocks for flush toilet bowls that slowly dissolve in water

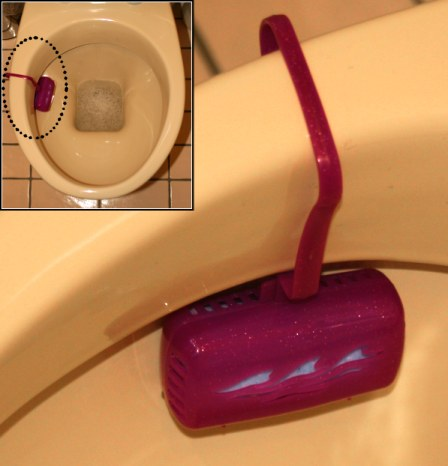
Location photo and close-up shot of a toilet rim block in its holder

A toilet rim block is a substance in the shape of a block that is used in flush toilets, which slowly dissolves in water. The blocks usually come in a small holder that is attached over the rim of a toilet and hangs down into the bowl, so as the toilet gets flushed, the water passes through the holder coming into contact with the block. With "liquid rims", however, liquid is held in a small bottle above—and connected to—the holder that slowly releases into the bottom of the holder (which is beneath the toilet rim), and so coming into contact with the water when the toilet is flushed.

However, the blocks also come loose, for placement directly in-cistern (and therefore usable with squat toilets that lack the same sort of rim), although these tend to be slightly different in composition, so as to dissolve slower, due to the constant contact with water. These may also contain a colorant (typically blue or green) which shows up in the pan or bowl water.

== Composition and action ==
Toilet rim blocks are marketed as disinfectants and deodorizers, while allegedly also helping to prevent the buildup of limescale in the toilet bowl.

The composition of toilet blocks can vary, but they may contain (among other components): borax (an ingredient of many detergents), hydroxyethylcellulose (a gelling agent), troclosene sodium (a disinfectant), sodium dodecylbenzenesulfonate (a surfactant), sodium percarbonate (a form of oxygen bleach), sodium carbonate ("washing soda"), and various perfumes like, e.g., limonene, butylphenyl methylpropional, and linalool.

As in the closely related urinal deodorizer blocks, some of the ingredients have irritating effects when applied to skin, eyes, or when swallowed. Their ecotoxicity is rated to be harmful to aquatic organisms and these chemicals may have long-term adverse effects for an aquatic environment.

== See also ==
- Household chemicals
- Ecological footprint
- List of health articles
