= 1,2-Dichlorobenzene =

- Skeletal structure of 1,2-Dichlorobenzene

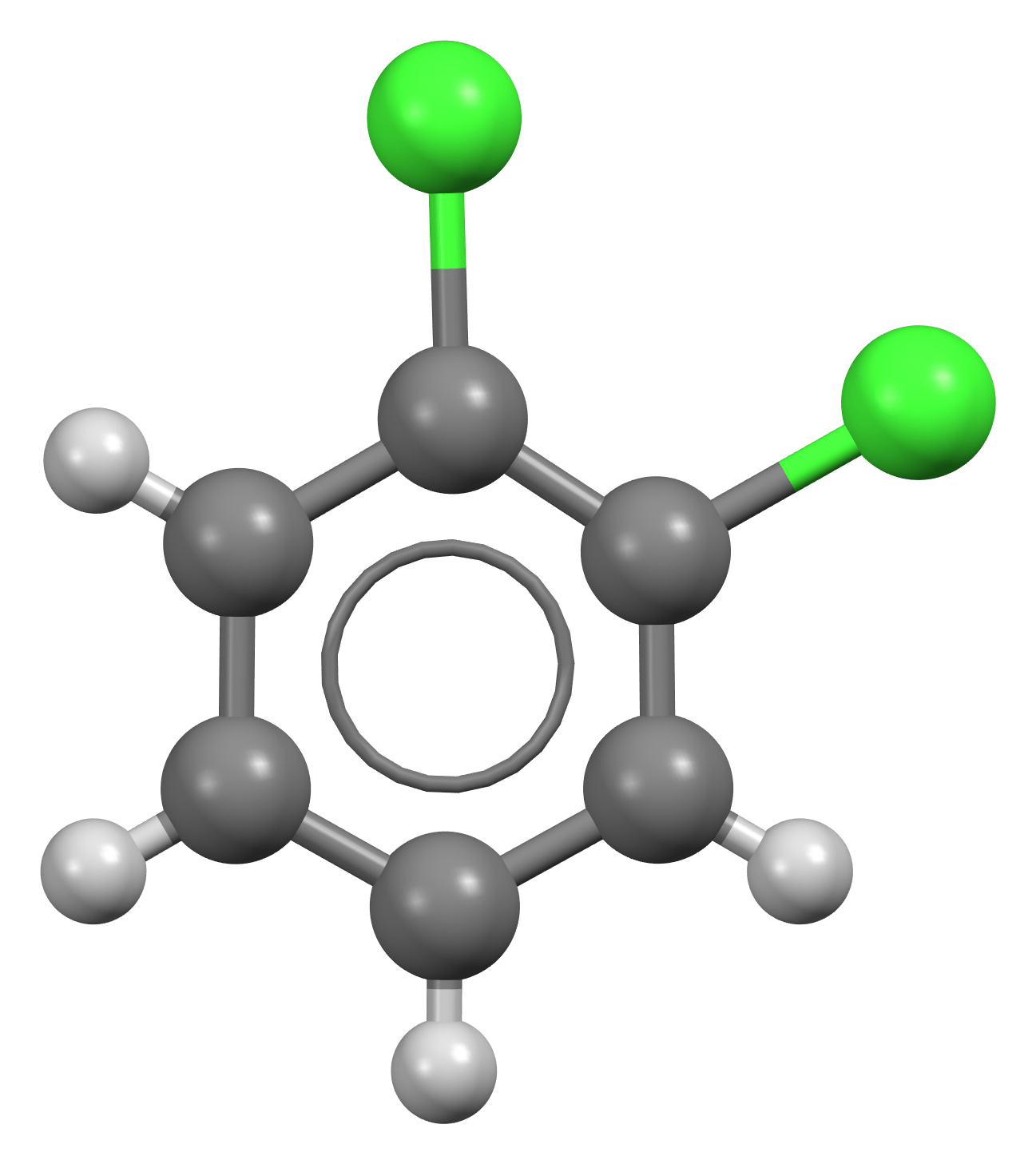
Ball-and-stick model of the 1,2-dichlorobenzene molecule
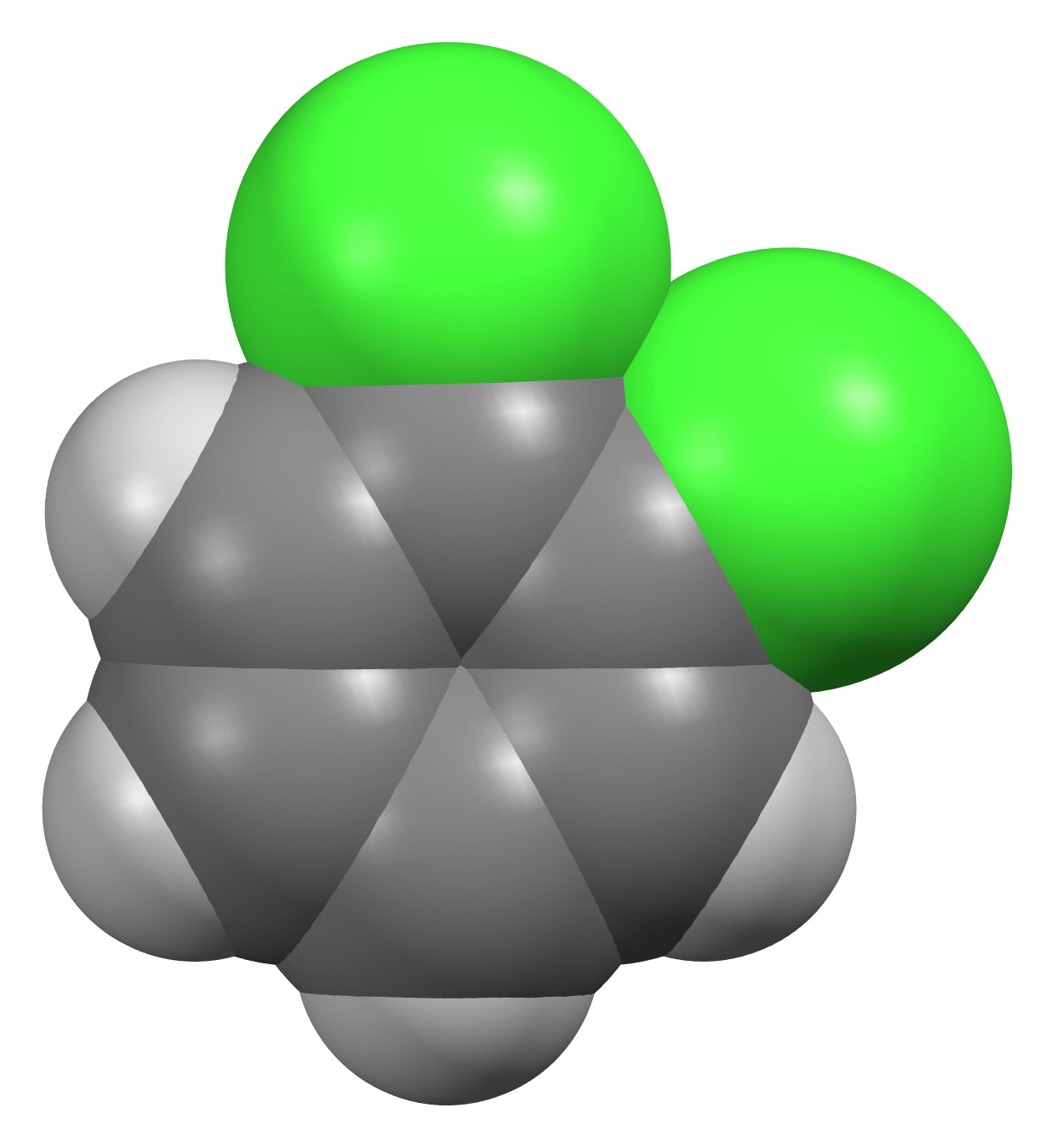
Space-filling model of the 1,2-dichlorobenzene molecule

Names
- Preferred IUPAC name 1,2-Dichlorobenzene
- Other names ortho-Dichlorobenzene, o-Dichlorobenzene, odcb, o-Dichlorobenzol

Identifiers
CAS Number	95-50-1
3D model (JSmol)	Interactive image; Interactive image
ChEBI	CHEBI:35290
ChEMBL	ChEMBL298461
ChemSpider	13837988
ECHA InfoCard	100.002.206
EC Number	202-425-9
KEGG	C14328
PubChem CID	7239
UNII	6PJ93I88XL
CompTox Dashboard (EPA)	DTXSID6020430
- InChI: InChI=1S/C6H4Cl2/c7-5-3-1-2-4-6(5)8/h1-4H Key: RFFLAFLAYFXFSW-UHFFFAOYSA-N; InChI=1/C6H4Cl2/c7-5-3-1-2-4-6(5)8/h1-4H Key: RFFLAFLAYFXFSW-UHFFFAOYAE
- SMILES: c1ccc(c(c1)Cl)Cl; c1ccc(c(c1)Cl)Cl

Properties
Chemical formula	C_{6}H_{4}Cl_{2}
Molar mass	147.00 g·mol^{−1}
Appearance	colourless liquid
Odor	Naphthalene-like
Density	1.30 g/cm^{3}
Melting point	−17.03 °C (1.35 °F; 256.12 K)
Boiling point	180.19 °C (356.34 °F; 453.34 K)
Solubility in water	0.01%
Vapor pressure	1 mmHg (20°C)
Magnetic susceptibility (χ)	−84.26·10^{−6} cm^{3}/mol
Refractive index (n_{D})	1.54920
Viscosity	1.0656 (20 °C)

Hazards
- Occupational safety and health (OHS/OSH)
Ingestion hazards	Mildly toxic
Inhalation hazards	Causes respiratory tract irritation
Eye hazards	Causes eye irritation
Skin hazards	Causes skin irritation
Flash point	66 °C (151 °F; 339 K)
Explosive limits	2.2%–9.2%
- Lethal dose or concentration (LD, LC)
LD_{50} (median dose)	500 mg/kg (oral, rat, rabbit); 200 mg/kg (oral, guinea pig); 436 mg/kg (oral, mouse)
LC_{Lo} (lowest published)	1000 ppm (guinea pig, 20 hr); 800 ppm (guinea pig, 24 hr); 821 ppm (rat, 7 hr)
- NIOSH (US health exposure limits)
PEL (Permissible)	C 50 ppm (300 mg/m^{3})
REL (Recommended)	C 50 ppm (300 mg/m^{3})
IDLH (Immediate danger)	200 ppm
Safety data sheet (SDS)	External MSDS

Related compounds
Related compounds	1,2-Difluorobenzene; 1,2-Dibromobenzene
- Except where otherwise noted, data are given for materials in their standard state (at 25 °C [77 °F], 100 kPa). verify (what is ?) Infobox references

1,2-Dichlorobenzene, or orthodichlorobenzene (ODCB), is an aryl chloride and isomer of dichlorobenzene with the formula C_{6}H_{4}Cl_{2}. This colourless liquid is poorly soluble in water but miscible with most organic solvents. It is a derivative of benzene, substituted with two adjacent chlorine atoms.

It is mainly used as a precursor chemical in the synthesis of agrochemicals, as a preferred solvent for dissolving and working with fullerenes, as an insecticide, and in softening and removing carbon-based contamination on metal surfaces.

== Production and uses ==
1,2-Dichlorobenzene is obtained as a side-product of the production of chlorobenzene:

C_{6}H_{5}Cl + Cl_{2} → C_{6}H_{4}Cl_{2} + HCl

The reaction also affords the 1,4- and small amounts of the 1,3-isomer. The 1,4- isomer is preferred over the 1,2- isomer due to steric hindrance. The 1,3- isomer is uncommon because it is a meta- compound, while chlorine, like all halogens, is an ortho/para- director in terms of electrophilic aromatic substitution.

It is mainly used as a precursor to 1,2-dichloro-4-nitrobenzene, an intermediate in the synthesis of agrochemicals. In terms of niche applications, 1,2-dichlorobenzene is a versatile, high-boiling solvent. It is a preferred solvent for dissolving and working with fullerenes. It is an insecticide for termites and locust borers, historically used by the United States Forest Service to combat widespread bark beetle outbreaks.

1,2-Dichlorobenzene is also used in softening and removing carbon-based contamination on metal surfaces.

== Safety ==
Data from human exposure to 1,2-dichlorobenzene shows that concentrations of 100 ppm have been reported to cause sporadic irritation of the eyes and respiratory tract. The Occupational Safety and Health Administration and the National Institute for Occupational Safety and Health have set occupational exposure limits at a ceiling of 50 ppm, over an eight-hour workday.

== See also ==
- Chlorobenzenes—different numbers of chlorine substituents and isomeric forms
