= Dibromobenzene =

Dibromobenzenes are a group of bromobenzenes with the formula C_{6}H_{4}Br_{2}, consisting of two bromine atoms bonded to a central benzene ring.

There are three isomers of dibromobenzene:

Dibromobenzene isomers
Common name and systematic name	1,2-Dibromobenzene	1,3-Dibromobenzene	1,4-Dibromobenzene
Structure
Molecular formula	C_{6}H_{4}Br_{2}
Molar mass	235.906 g/mol
Appearance	colorless liquid	colorless liquid	white solid
CAS number	[583-53-9]	[108-36-1]	[106-37-6]
Properties
Density and phase	1.9940 g/ml, liquid	1.9523 g/ml, liquid	1.84 g/ml, solid
Solubility in water	practically insoluble
Other solubilities			Soluble in 70 parts ethanol. Soluble in benzene, chloroform and very soluble in diethyl ether.
Melting point	7.1 °C	−7.0 °C	87 °C
Boiling point	225 °C	218–220 °C	220.4 °C

== See also ==
- Dichlorobenzene
