= 1,2,4,5-Tetrabromobenzene =

Names
- Preferred IUPAC name 1,2,4,5-Tetrabromobenzene

Identifiers
| CAS Number | 636-28-2 |
| 3D model (JSmol) | Interactive image |
| ChemSpider | 11974 |
| ECHA InfoCard | 100.010.231 |
| EC Number | 211-253-3 |
| PubChem CID | 12486 |
| UNII | M25DK66LCZ |
| CompTox Dashboard (EPA) | DTXSID7060910 |
- InChI: InChI=1S/C6H2Br4/c7-3-1-4(8)6(10)2-5(3)9/h1-2H Key: QCKHVNQHBOGZER-UHFFFAOYSA-N
- SMILES: C1=C(C(=CC(=C1Br)Br)Br)Br

Properties
| Chemical formula | C_{6}H_{2}Br_{4} |
| Molar mass | 393.70 g/mol |
| Appearance | white solid |
| Density | 2.518 g/cm^{3} |
| Melting point | 180–182 °C (356–360 °F; 453–455 K) |

Hazards
- GHS labelling
| Pictograms | (GHS07: Exclamation mark) |
| Signal word | Warning |
| Hazard statements | H315, H319, H335, H413 |
| Precautionary statements | P261, P264, P271, P273, P280, P302+P352, P304+P340, P305+P351+P338, P312, P321, P332+P313, P337+P313, P362, P403+P233, P405, P501 |
- Except where otherwise noted, data are given for materials in their standard state (at 25 °C [77 °F], 100 kPa). Infobox references

1,2,4,5-Tetrabromobenzene is an aryl bromide and a four-substituted bromobenzene with the formula C_{6}H_{2}Br_{4}. It is one of three isomers of tetrabromobenzene. The compound is a white solid. 1,2,4,5-Tetrabromobenzene is an important metabolite of the flame retardant hexabromobenzene.

== Preparation ==
The synthesis of 1,2,4,5-tetrabromobenzene has already been reported in 1865 from benzene and excess bromine in a sealed tube at 150 °C. However, the clearly reduced melting point of about 160 °C indicates impurities in the final product. In his 1885 dissertation, Adolf Scheufelen published the synthesis of a purer sample using iron(III) chloride FeCl_{3} as a catalyst, isolated as "pretty needles" ("schönen Nadeln").

Synthese von 1,2,4,5-Tetrabrombenzol

The synthesis can also be carried out in solution in chloroform or tetrachloromethane and yields 1,2,4,5-tetrabromobenzene in 89% yield. This reaction can also be carried out in a laboratory experiment with excess bromine and iron nails (as starting material for iron (III) bromide FeBr_{3}). The intermediate stage is 1,4-dibromobenzene, which reacts further with excess bromine to give 1,2,4,5-tetrabromobenzene.

== Reactions ==
=== Building block for liquid crystals and fluorescent dyes ===
Owing to its symmetrical structure and reactivity, 1,2,4,5-tetrabromobenzene is a precursor to nematic liquid crystals with crossed mesogens and for columnar (discotic) liquid crystals with an extensive planar, "board-like" tetrabenzoanthracene core.

Synthesis of discotic LC from 1,2,4,5-Tetrabromobenzene.

In a one-pot reaction, 1,2,4,5-tetrabromobenzene reacts with 4-hydroxybenzaldehyde, the alkylating agent 1-bromopentane, the Wittig reagent methyltriphenylphosphonium iodide, the base potassium carbonate, the phase transfer catalyst tetrabutylammonium bromide, the Heck reagent palladium(II)acetate and the Heck co-catalyst 1,3-bis(diphenylphosphino)propane (dppp) in dimethylacetamide obtaining directly a symmetrical tetraalkoxylstilbene as E-isomer in 17% yield.

Synthese eines symmetrischer Tetraalkoxystilbens

Due to their pronounced π-conjugation such compounds could be potentially applied as optical brighteners, OLED materials or liquid crystals.

N-alkyl-tetraaminobenzenes are available from 1,2,4,5-tetrabromobenzene in high yields, which can be cyclized with triethyl orthoformate and acids to benzobis(imidazolium) salts (BBI salts) and oxidized with oxygen to form 1,4-benzoquinone diimines.

Synthese von BBI-Salzen und Benzochinondiiminen

BBI salts are versatile fluorescent dyes with emission wavelengths λ_{em} between 329 and 561 nm, pronounced solvatochromism and strong solvent-dependent Stokes shift, which can be used as protein tag for fluorescent labeling of proteins.

=== Starting material for arynes ===
From 1,2,4,5-tetrabromobenzene, a 1,4-monoarine can be prepared in-situ with one equivalent of n-butyllithium by bromine abstraction, which reacts immediately with furan to form 6,7-dibromo-1,4-epoxy-1,4-dihydronaphthalene (6,7-dibromonaphthalene-1,4-endoxide) in 70% yield.

Bildung eines 1,4-Monoarins aus 1,2,4,5-Tetrabrombenzol

When 2,5-dialkylfurans (e.g. 2,5- (di-n-octyl)furan) are used, the dibrominated monoendoxide is formed in 64% yield, from which dibromo-5,8-di-n-octylnaphthalene is formed with zink powder/titanium tetrachloride in 88% yield.

Synthese von Dibromdioctylnaphthalin aus 1,2,4,5-Tetrabrombenzol

Upon treatment with titanium tetrachloride and zinc dust, the endoxide is deoxygenated yielding 2,3-dibromnaphthalene.

The endoxide reacts with 3-sulfolene in a Diels-Alder reaction upon elimination of sulfur dioxide. The resulting tricyclic adduct converts to 2,3-dibromoanthracene in good yield.

If the dibromene oxide is allowed to react further with furan, in the presence of n-butyllithium or potassium amide or via an intermediate 1,4-aryne the tricyclic 1,4-adduct 1,4:5.8-diepoxy-1,4,5,8-tetrahydroanthracene is formed in 71% yield as a syn-anti-mixture. With sodium amide in ethylene glycol dimethyl ether (DME), however, the dibromene oxide behaves as a 1,3-aryne equivalent and forms with furan a phenanthrene-like tricyclic 1,3-adduct, which can react with furan and sodium amide to a triphenylene derivative (1,3,5-tris-arene).

[2+4] cycloadditions with 1,2,4,5-tetrabromobenzene sometimes proceed in very high yields, such as the reaction of a dihalogen-substituted 1,3-diphenyl-isobenzofuran to a tetrahalogenated anthracene derivative (98%), which is converted successively further with 1,3-diphenyl isobenzofuran in 65% yield to a pentacene derivative and furan to a hexacene derivative (67%).

Bildung eines Hexacen-Derivats aus 1,2,4,5-Tetrabrombenzol

The crosslinking of benzimidazole-modified polymers provides materials with a high absorption capacity for carbon dioxide, which could be suitable for CO_{2} separation from gas mixtures.

Bildung eines vernetzten Benzimidazolpolymers

It is the starting material for mono- and bis-aryines.

== Safety ==
1,2,4,5-Tetrabromobenzene is a liver toxic degradation product of the flame retardant hexabromobenzene and was detected in Japan in 1987 in human mother's milk samples.
