= 4-Bromoaniline =

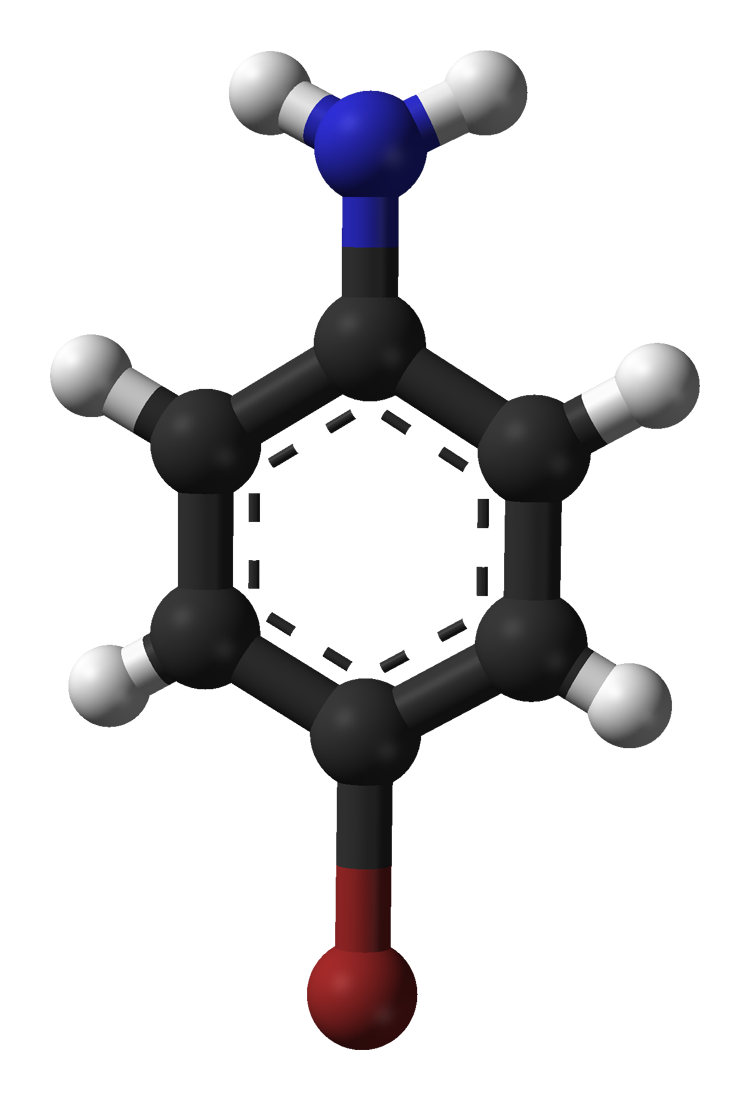

Names
- Preferred IUPAC name 4-Bromoaniline
- Other names: (4-Bromophenyl)amine; p-Bromoaniline; 4-Bromobenzenamine; p-Bromophenylamine

Identifiers
CAS Number	106-40-1
3D model (JSmol)	Interactive image
ChEMBL	ChEMBL57376
ChemSpider	7519
ECHA InfoCard	100.003.086
EC Number	203-393-9
PubChem CID	7807
RTECS number	BW9280000
UNII	0RR61TC330
UN number	2811
CompTox Dashboard (EPA)	DTXSID7021867
- InChI: InChI=1S/C6H6BrN/c7-5-1-3-6(8)4-2-5/h1-4H,8H2 Key: WDFQBORIUYODSI-UHFFFAOYSA-N; InChI=1/C6H6BrN/c7-5-1-3-6(8)4-2-5/h1-4H,8H2 Key: WDFQBORIUYODSI-UHFFFAOYAG
- SMILES: Brc1ccc(N)cc1

Properties
Chemical formula	C_{6}H_{6}BrN
Molar mass	172.025 g·mol^{−1}
Density	1.5 g/cm^{3}
Melting point	60 to 64 °C (140 to 147 °F; 333 to 337 K)
Solubility in water	<0.1 g/100 mL at 23 °C
Magnetic susceptibility (χ)	−84.06·10^{−6} cm^{3}/mol

Hazards
- GHS labelling
Pictograms	(GHS06: Toxic) (GHS07: Exclamation mark) (GHS08: Health hazard)
Signal word	Danger
Hazard statements	H302, H311, H315, H319, H332, H335, H373
Precautionary statements	P260, P264, P270, P271, P280, P301+P312, P302+P352, P304+P312, P304+P340, P305+P351+P338, P312, P314, P321, P322, P330, P332+P313, P337+P313, P361, P362, P363, P403+P233, P405, P501
Safety data sheet (SDS)	External MSDS
- Except where otherwise noted, data are given for materials in their standard state (at 25 °C [77 °F], 100 kPa). verify (what is ?) Infobox references

4-Bromoaniline is a compound where an aniline molecule is substituted with a bromine atom on the para position. Commercially available, this compound may be used as a building block, e.g. in the preparation of monobrominated biphenyl via the Gomberg–Bachmann reaction.

== Preparation ==
4-Bromoaniline can be made by reacting acetyl chloride-protected aniline with bromine.

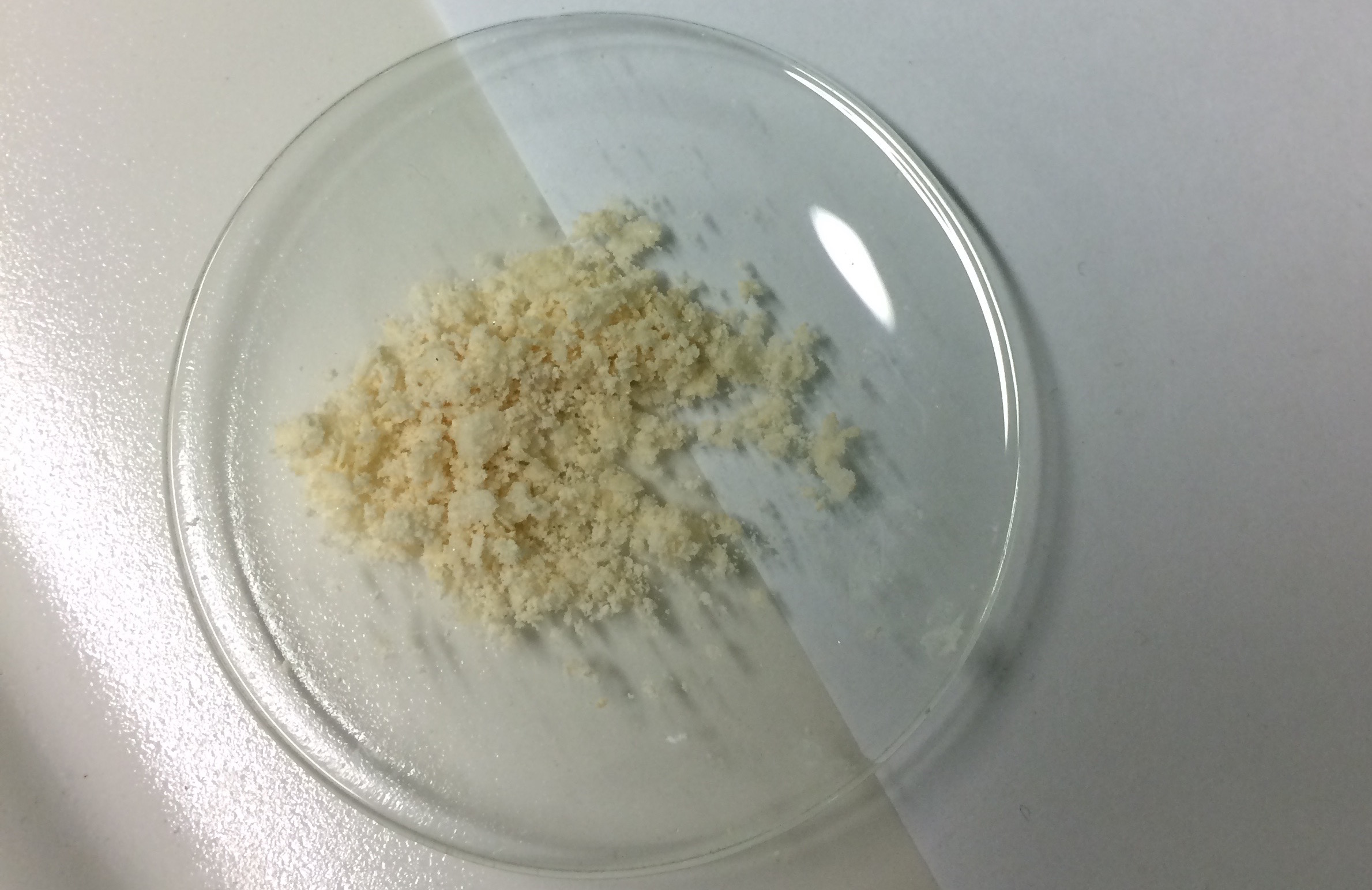
Synthesized and purified p-bromoaniline

== Reactions ==
One laboratory route to 1-bromo-4-iodobenzene involves the Sandmeyer reaction. 4-Bromoaniline is treated with concentrated sulfuric acid and sodium nitrite, then potassium iodide.
