= Urinal deodorizer block =

Small disinfectant block added to urinals

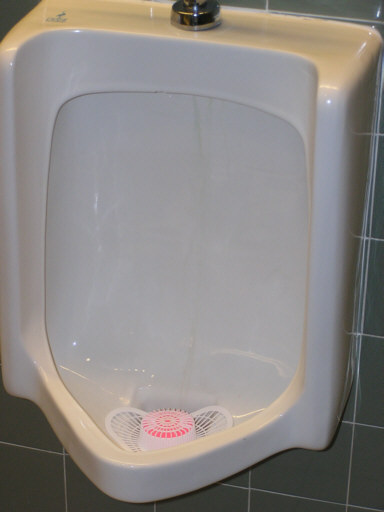
A pink deodorizer block + urinal screen in a urinal at Georgia Southern University

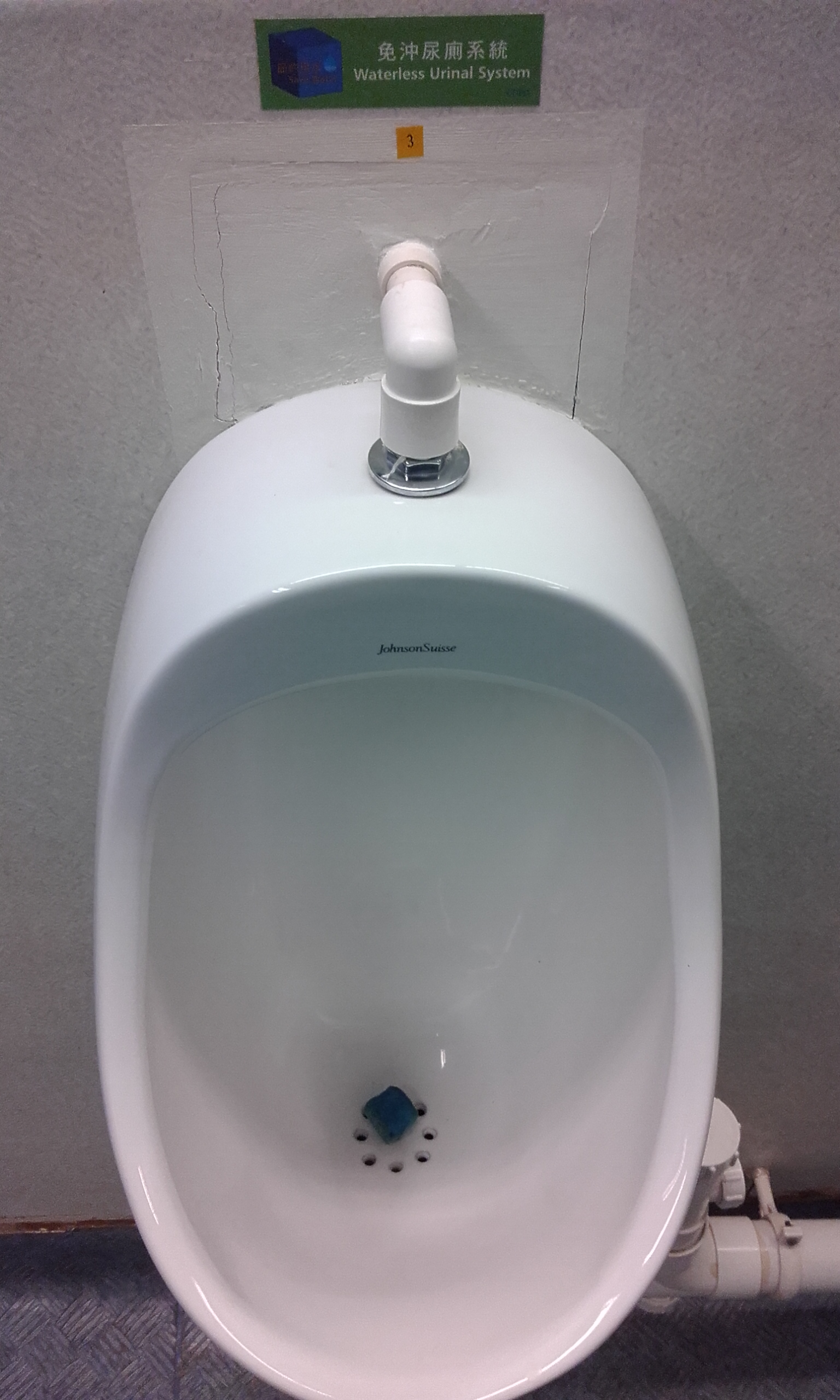
A Johnson Suisse waterless urinal with a block placed above the drain at City University of Hong Kong

Urinal deodorizer blocks (Note: (commonly known as urinal cakes, urinal cookies, urinal biscuits (or humorously piscuits), urinal donuts, urinal mints, toilet lollies, trough lollies, hockey pucks, urinal pucks, toilet pucks, lemon bon bons, or urinal peons (alternately urinal pee-ons))) are small disinfectant blocks or tablets that are added to urinals. As these products originally contained para-dichlorobenzene (pDCB), they may also be called para blocks. Besides disinfecting, the purpose of these materials is to deodorize restroom urinals. They are placed above the urinal drain, often in the confines of a small plastic device called a urinal screen that prevents loss down the drain when they dissolve down to a small size.

== Chemistry ==
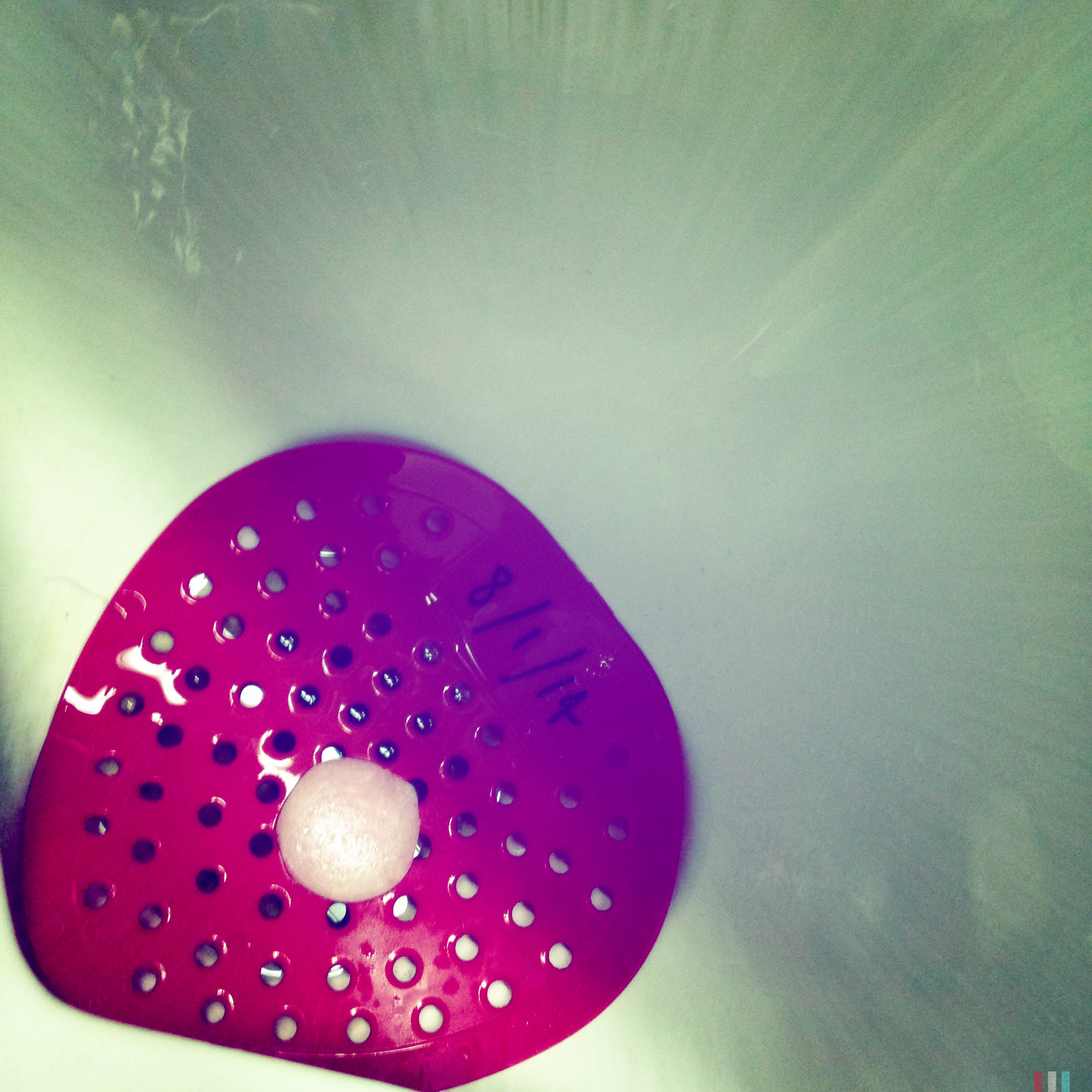
Para block

The chemicals composing the block vary. The original formulations were based upon naphthalene and then later para-dichlorobenzene, both now known to be hazardous to health by inhalation. In some areas, the use of para-dichlorobenzene-based blocks has been banned; in other areas para-dichlorobenzene blocks or "para blocks" are still used. Para-dichlorobenzene- and naphthalene-based blocks do not readily dissolve in water/urine, but easily sublime into the air, creating a sickly-sweet odor that has anti-microbial effects.

Many urinal blocks are now para-dichlorobenzene and naphthalene free; these water-soluble alternative blocks are made from a mixture of fragrances and surfactants (normally quaternary ammonium compounds), which offer some active cleaning and antibacterial efficacy. The new water-soluble blocks improve the cleaning of the pipes which helps to reduce odor. Some recent formulations also include bacterial spores which, coupled with the surfactant cleaning power, can more completely get rid of odors and blockages caused by the buildup of solids in the traps and pipes. Some manufacturers claim that these "biological blocks" can enable completely no-flush waterless urinals to be fitted.

Some urinal blocks also have enzymes added to help digest buildup within pipes.

Autoflush and/or ice are sometimes used as alternatives.

== See also ==
- Air freshener
- Toilet rim block
