= 1,2-Difluorobenzene =

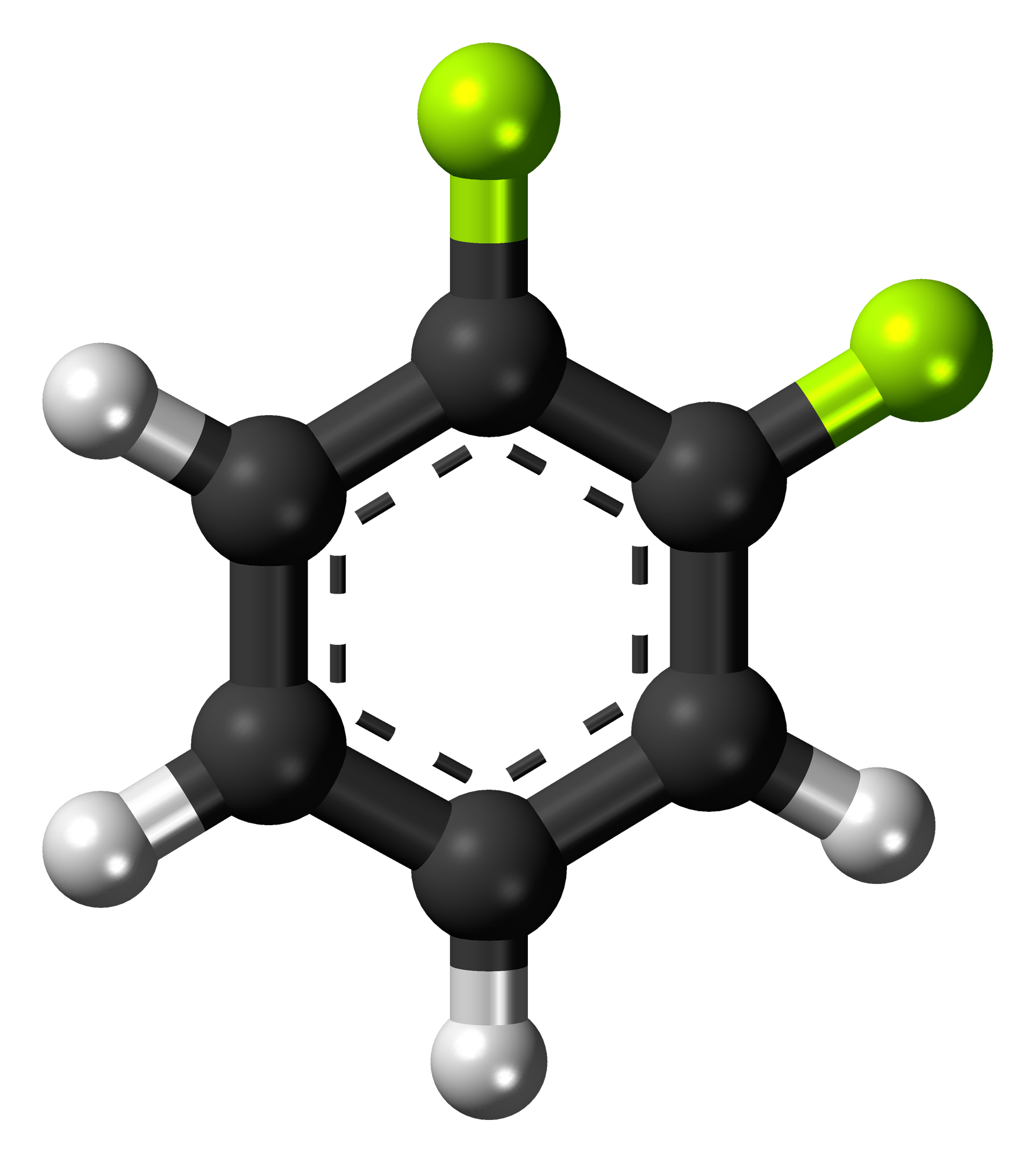

Names
- Preferred IUPAC name 1,2-Difluorobenzene
- Other names o-Difluorobenzene ortho-Difluorobenzene; DFB

Identifiers
CAS Number	367-11-3
3D model (JSmol)	Interactive image
Abbreviations	o-DFB; 1,2-DFB
ChEBI	CHEBI:38583
ChemSpider	9325
ECHA InfoCard	100.006.074
PubChem CID	9706
UNII	AW7QGMW29C
CompTox Dashboard (EPA)	DTXSID2075390
- InChI: InChI=1S/C6H4F2/c7-5-3-1-2-4-6(5)8/h1-4H Key: GOYDNIKZWGIXJT-UHFFFAOYSA-N; InChI=1/C6H4F2/c7-5-3-1-2-4-6(5)8/h1-4H Key: GOYDNIKZWGIXJT-UHFFFAOYAN
- SMILES: Fc1ccccc1F

Properties
Chemical formula	C_{6}H_{4}F_{2}
Molar mass	114.095 g·mol^{−1}
Appearance	colorless liquid
Density	1.1599 g/cm^{3}
Melting point	−34 °C (−29 °F; 239 K)
Boiling point	92 °C (198 °F; 365 K)
Solubility in water	(insoluble) 1.14 g/L

Related compounds
Related compounds	1,2-Dichlorobenzene
- Except where otherwise noted, data are given for materials in their standard state (at 25 °C [77 °F], 100 kPa). verify (what is ?) Infobox references

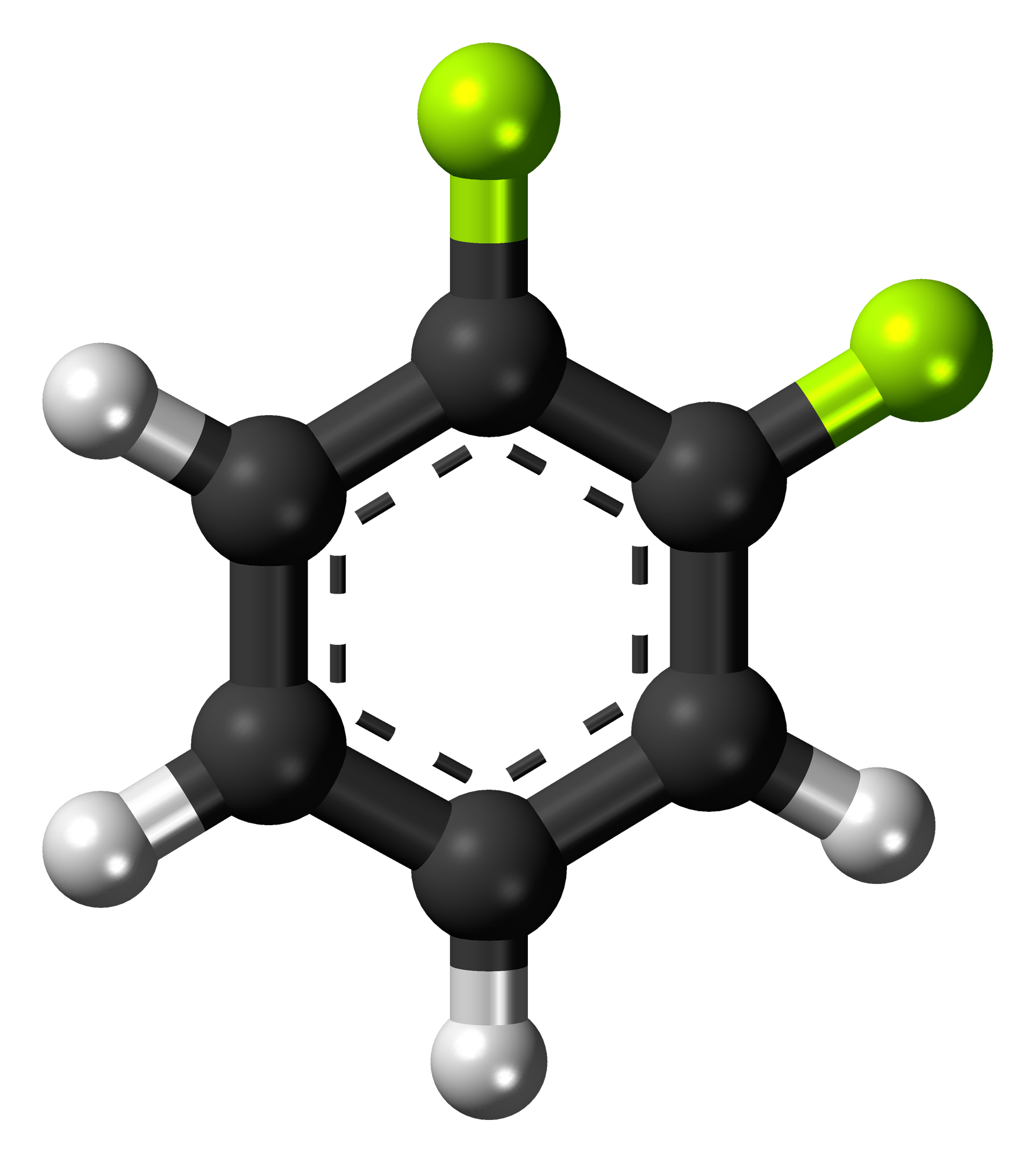
Ball-and-stick model of Difluorobenzene

1,2-Difluorobenzene, also known as DFB, is an aromatic compound with formula C_{6}H_{4}F_{2}. This colorless flammable liquid is a solvent used in the electrochemical studies of transition metal complexes. Compared to most conventional halogenated aliphatic and aromatic solvents, it possesses an exceptionally high dielectric constant (ε_{0} = 13.8 at 300 K). Thus, it can be a suitable solvent for cationic, and/or highly electrophilic organometallic complexes.

== Synthesis ==
Difluorobenzenes can be prepared by the Balz-Schiemann reaction, which entails conversion of diazonium tetrafluoroborate salts to their fluorides. The synthesis of 1,2-difluorobenzene starts with 2-fluoroaniline:

C_{6}H_{4}F(NH_{2}) + HNO_{2} + HBF_{4} → [C_{6}H_{4}F(N_{2})]BF_{4} + 2 H_{2}O
[C_{6}H_{4}F(N_{2})]BF_{4} → C_{6}H_{4}F_{2} + N_{2} + BF_{3}

The syntheses of 1,3- and 1,4-difluorobenzene proceed respectively from 1,3- and 1,4-diaminobenzene, which are doubly diazotized.

== Laboratory applications ==
Organometallic derivatives of 1,2-difluorobenzene have been well developed. It is found to be a weaker base than benzene.

1,2-Difluorobenzene has been used as solvent for the electrochemical analysis of transition metal complexes. It is relatively chemically inert, weakly coordinating and has a relatively high dielectric constant. In contrast to acetonitrile, DMSO, and DMF it is a weakly coordinating solvent for metal complexes, .

It has anaesthetic properties.

1,2-Difluorobenzene can be acylated to 3',4'-difluoropropiophenone.
