= 1,3-Dibromobenzene =

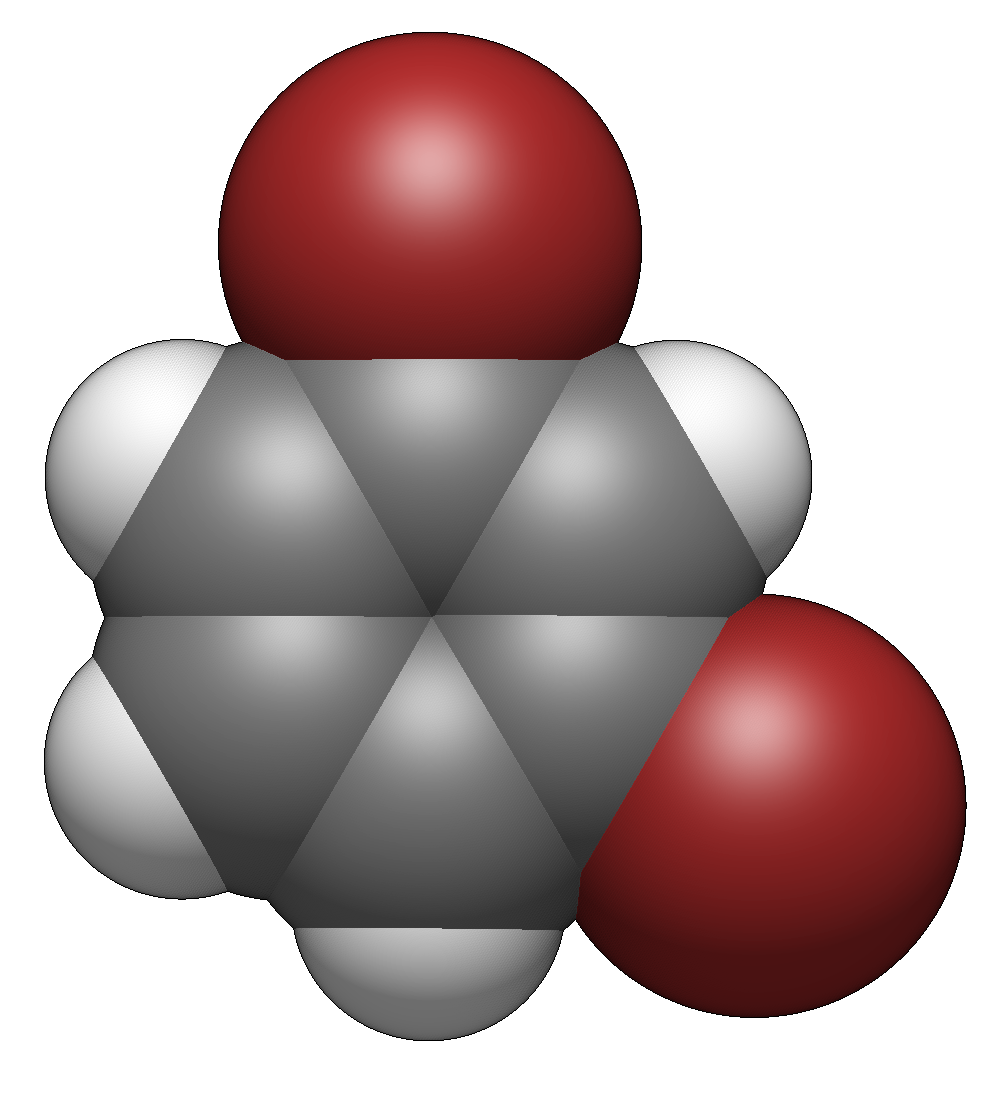

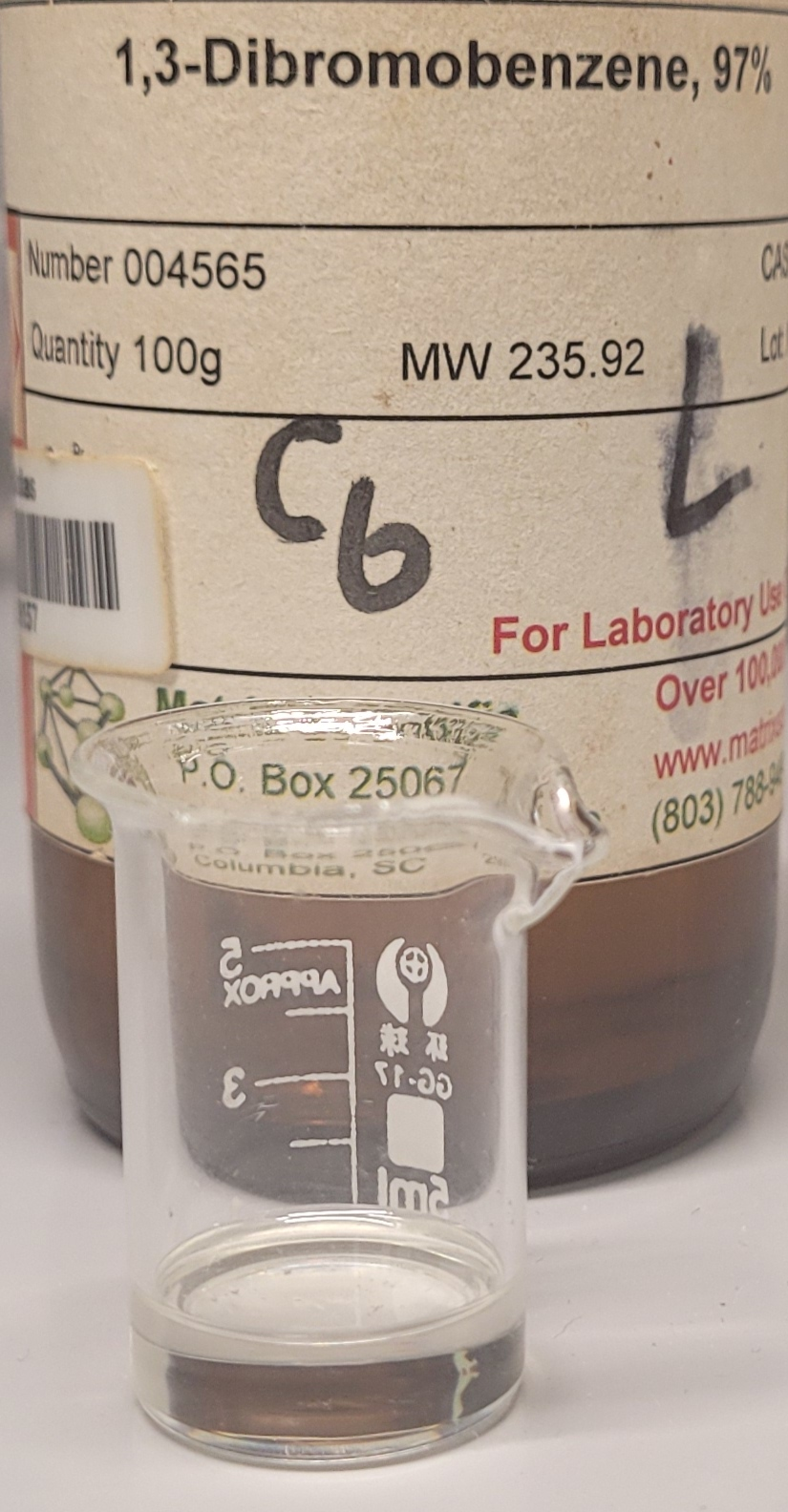

Names
- Preferred IUPAC name 1,3-Dibromobenzene
- Other names m-Dibromobenzene

Identifiers
CAS Number	108-36-1
3D model (JSmol)	Interactive image
Beilstein Reference	1904538
ChEBI	CHEBI:37151
ChemSpider	13875356
ECHA InfoCard	100.003.250
EC Number	203-574-2
Gmelin Reference	363342
PubChem CID	7927
UNII	74EF6KH8TC
CompTox Dashboard (EPA)	DTXSID7051555
- InChI: InChI=1S/C6H4Br2/c7-5-2-1-3-6(8)4-5/h1-4H Key: JSRLURSZEMLAFO-UHFFFAOYSA-N
- SMILES: C1=CC(=CC(=C1)Br)Br

Properties
Chemical formula	C_{6}H_{4}Br_{2}
Molar mass	235.906 g·mol^{−1}
Appearance	colorless liquid
Density	1.9523 g/cm^{3} at 20.4 °C
Melting point	−7.0 °C (19.4 °F; 266.1 K)
Boiling point	218–220 °C (424–428 °F; 491–493 K)

Related compounds
Related compounds	1,2-Dibromobenzene; 1,4-Dibromobenzene; 1,3-Dichlorobenzene
- Except where otherwise noted, data are given for materials in their standard state (at 25 °C [77 °F], 100 kPa). Infobox references

1,3-Dibromobenzene (m-dibromobenzene) is an aryl bromide and isomer of dibromobenzene that is a colorless liquid at room temperature.

== Preparation ==
1,3-Dibromobenzene may be prepared by diazotization of 3-bromoaniline, followed by a Sandmeyer reaction with cuprous bromide.

== Uses ==
1,3-Dibromobenzene has been used as a starting material in the synthesis of antiviral Lufotrelvir, in human clinical trials for the treatment of COVID-19. The first step is formylation of 1,3-dibromobenzene to 2,6-dibromobenzaldehyde, by lithiation with lithium diisopropylamide in THF, followed by quenching with dimethylformamide.

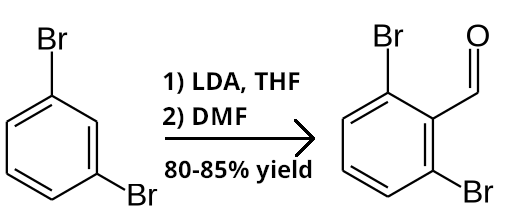

== See also ==
- 1,2-Dibromobenzene
- 1,4-Dibromobenzene
