= Tetrabromobisphenol A =

Names
- Preferred IUPAC name 4,4′-(Propane-2,2-diyl)bis(2,6-dibromophenol)
- Other names 2,2′,6,6′-Tetrabromobisphenol A, 2,2′,6,6′-Tetrabromo-4,4′-isopropylidenediphenol, 2,2-Bis(3,5-dibromo-4-hydroxyphenyl)propane, 4,4′-Isopropylidenebis(2,6-dibromophenol)

Identifiers
CAS Number	79-94-7
3D model (JSmol)	Interactive image
Abbreviations	TBBPA, TBBP-A, TBBA
ChEBI	CHEBI:33217
ChEMBL	ChEMBL184450
ChemSpider	6366
ECHA InfoCard	100.001.125
EC Number	201-236-9
KEGG	C13620
MeSH	C443737
PubChem CID	6618
UNII	FQI02RFC3A
CompTox Dashboard (EPA)	DTXSID1026081
- InChI: InChI=1S/C15H12Br4O2/c1-15(2,7-3-9(16)13(20)10(17)4-7)8-5-11(18)14(21)12(19)6-8/h3-6,20-21H,1-2H3 Key: VEORPZCZECFIRK-UHFFFAOYSA-N
- SMILES: CC(C)(c1cc(Br)c(O)c(Br)c1)c1cc(Br)c(O)c(Br)c1

Properties
Chemical formula	C_{15}H_{12}Br_{4}O_{2}
Molar mass	543.9 g·mol^{−1}
Density	2,12 g·cm^{−3} (20 °C)
Melting point	178 °C (352 °F; 451 K)
Boiling point	250 °C (482 °F; 523 K) (decomposition)
Solubility in water	insoluble

Hazards
- Occupational safety and health (OHS/OSH)
Main hazards	N
- GHS labelling
Pictograms	(GHS09: Environmental hazard)
Signal word	Warning
Hazard statements	H410
Precautionary statements	P273, P391, P501
- Except where otherwise noted, data are given for materials in their standard state (at 25 °C [77 °F], 100 kPa). verify (what is ?) Infobox references

Tetrabromobisphenol A (TBBPA) is a brominated flame retardant. The compound is a white solid (not colorless), although commercial samples appear yellow. It is one of the most common flame retardants.

== Production and use ==
TBBPA is produced by the reaction of bromine with bisphenol A. Most commercial TBBPA products consist of a mixture that differ in the degree of bromination with the formula C_{15}H_{16−x}Br_{x}O_{2} where x = 1 to 4. Its fire-retarding properties correlate with its bromine content. The annual consumption in Europe has been estimated as 6200 tons in 2004.

TBBPA is mainly used as a reactive component of polymers, meaning that it is incorporated into the polymer backbone. It is used to prepare fire-resistant polycarbonates by replacing some bisphenol A. A lower grade of TBBPA is used to prepare epoxy resins, used in printed circuit boards.

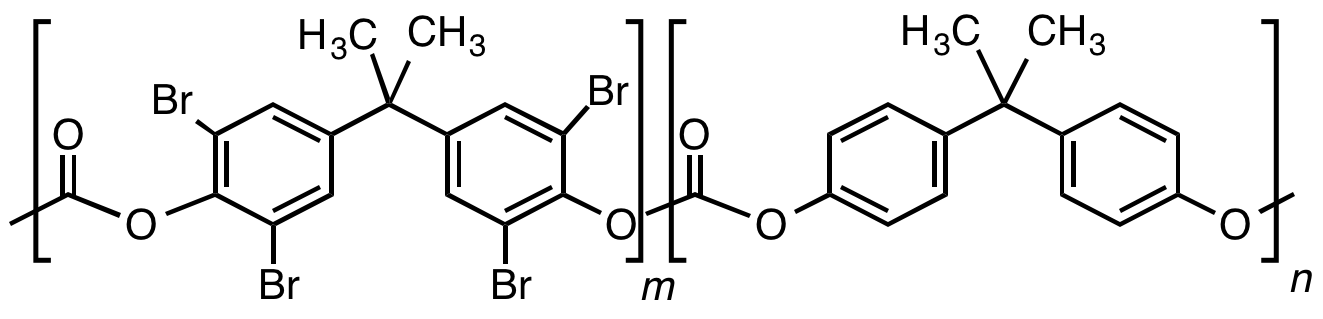
Structure of copolymer of polycarbonate containing the tetrabrominated monomer

== Toxicity ==
A study was published by the European Food Safety Authority (EFSA) in December 2011 on the exposure of TBBPA and its derivatives in food. The study, which examined at 344 food samples from the fish and other seafood food group, concluded that “current dietary exposure to TBBPA in the European Union does not raise a health concern.” EFSA also determined that “additional exposure, particularly of young children, to TBBPA from house dust is unlikely to raise a health concern”.

Some studies suggest that TBBPA may be an endocrine disruptor and immunotoxicant. As an endocrine disruptor, TBBPA may interfere with both estrogens and androgens. Further, TBBPA structurally mimics the thyroid hormone thyroxin (T_{4}) and can bind more strongly to the transport protein transthyretin than T_{4} does, likely interfering with normal T_{4} activity. TBBPA likely also suppresses immune responses by inhibiting expression of CD25 receptors on T cells, preventing their activation, and by reducing natural killer cell activity.

A 2013 literature review on TBBPA concludes that TBBPA does not produce “adverse effects that might be considered to be related to disturbances in the endocrine system”. Therefore, in accordance with internationally accepted definitions, TBBPA should not be considered an “endocrine disruptor”. Furthermore, TBBPA is rapidly excreted in mammals and therefore does not have a potential for bioaccumulation. Measured concentrations of TBBPA in house dust, human diet and human serum samples are very low. Daily intakes of TBBPA in humans were estimated to not exceed a few ng/kg bw/day. Exposures of the general population are also well below the derived-no-effect-levels (DNELs) derived for endpoints of potential concern in REACH.

TBBPA degrades to bisphenol A and to TBBPA dimethyl ether, and experiments in zebrafish (Danio rerio) suggest that during development, TBBPA may be more toxic than either BPA or TBBPA dimethyl ether.

=== Occurrence ===
TBBPA emits can be found in trace concentration in the hydrosphere, soil, and sediments. It also occurs in sewage sludge and house dust. TBBPA has been the subject of an eight-year evaluation under the EU Risk Assessment procedure which reviewed over 460 studies. The Risk Assessment was published on the EU Official Journal in June 2008. The conclusions of the Risk Assessment were confirmed by the European Commission SCHER Committee (Scientific Committee on Health and Environmental Risks). TBBPA has been registered under REACH.

== See also ==
- Dinitrobisphenol A
