= Dichlorobenzene =

There are three distinct chemical compounds which are dichlorobenzenes:

- 1,2-Dichlorobenzene or ortho-dichlorobenzene;
- 1,3-Dichlorobenzene or meta-dichlorobenzene;
- 1,4-Dichlorobenzene or para-dichlorobenzene.

All three isomers are colorless chlorobenzenes with the formula C_{6}H_{4}Cl_{2}. They differ structurally based on where the two chlorine atoms are attached to the ring.

== See also ==
- Dibromobenzene
