= 1,4-Dibromobenzene =

Names
- Preferred IUPAC name 1,4-Dibromobenzene
- Other names p-Dibromobenzene

Identifiers
| CAS Number | 106-37-6 |
| 3D model (JSmol) | Interactive image |
| ChEBI | CHEBI:37150 |
| ChEMBL | ChEMBL195407 |
| ChemSpider | 13868640 |
| ECHA InfoCard | 100.003.083 |
| EC Number | 203-390-2 |
| PubChem CID | 7804 |
| UNII | 9991W3M5HZ |
| CompTox Dashboard (EPA) | DTXSID4024012 |
- InChI: InChI=1S/C6H4Br2/c7-5-1-2-6(8)4-3-5/h1-4H Key: SWJPEBQEEAHIGZ-UHFFFAOYSA-N; InChI=1/C6H4Br2/c7-5-1-2-6(8)4-3-5/h1-4H Key: SWJPEBQEEAHIGZ-UHFFFAOYAE
- SMILES: Brc1ccc(Br)cc1

Properties
| Chemical formula | C_{6}H_{4}Br_{2} |
| Molar mass | 235.906 g·mol^{−1} |
| Appearance | White solid |
| Density | 1.84 g/cm^{3} |
| Melting point | 87 °C (189 °F; 360 K) |
| Boiling point | 220.4 °C (428.7 °F; 493.5 K) |
| Solubility in water | Practically insoluble |
| Solubility in other solvents | Soluble in 70 parts ethanol Soluble in benzene, chloroform and very soluble in diethyl ether |
| Magnetic susceptibility (χ) | −101.4·10^{−6} cm^{3}/mol |

Hazards
- GHS labelling
| Pictograms | (GHS07: Exclamation mark) (GHS09: Environmental hazard) |
| Signal word | Warning |
| Hazard statements | H315, H319, H335, H400, H411 |
| Precautionary statements | P261, P264, P271, P273, P280, P302+P352, P304+P340, P305+P351+P338, P312, P321, P332+P313, P337+P313, P362, P391, P403+P233, P405, P501 |

Related compounds
| Related compounds | 1,2-Dibromobenzene; 1,3-Dibromobenzene; 1-Bromo-4-iodobenzene |
- Except where otherwise noted, data are given for materials in their standard state (at 25 °C [77 °F], 100 kPa). verify (what is ?) Infobox references

1,4-Dibromobenzene (p-dibromobenzene) is an aryl bromide and isomer of dibromobenzene that is solid at room temperature. It has a strong smell similar to that of the lighter chlorine analogue. It can be used as a precursor to the dye 6,6-dibromoindigo.

== See also ==
- 1,2-Dibromobenzene
- 1,3-Dibromobenzene
- 1-Bromo-4-iodobenzene
