= Rhodococcus phenolicus =

Scientific classification
- Domain: Bacteria
- Kingdom: Bacillati
- Phylum: Actinomycetota
- Class: Actinomycetes
- Order: Mycobacteriales
- Family: Nocardiaceae
- Genus: Rhodococcus
- Species: R. phenolicus

Binomial name
- Rhodococcus phenolicus Rehfuss and Urban 2006

Species of bacterium

Rhodococcus phenolicus is a bacterium species in the genus Rhodococcus. Phenolicus comes from Neo-Latin noun phenol -olis, phenol; Latin masculine gender suff. -icus, suffix used in adjectives with the sense of belonging to; Neo-Latin masculine gender adjective phenolicus, belonging to phenol. This species is able to degrade phenol as sole carbon source.
