= 1,3-Dichlorobenzene =

Names
- Preferred IUPAC name 1,3-Dichlorobenzene
- Other names m-Dichlorobenzene; meta-Dichlorobenzene

Identifiers
CAS Number	541-73-1
3D model (JSmol)	Interactive image
ChemSpider	13857694
ECHA InfoCard	100.007.994
PubChem CID	10943
UNII	75W0WNE5FP
CompTox Dashboard (EPA)	DTXSID6022056
- InChI: InChI=1S/C6H4Cl2/c7-5-2-1-3-6(8)4-5/h1-4H Key: ZPQOPVIELGIULI-UHFFFAOYSA-N; InChI=1/C6H4Cl2/c7-5-2-1-3-6(8)4-5/h1-4H Key: ZPQOPVIELGIULI-UHFFFAOYAZ
- SMILES: ClC1=CC=CC(Cl)=C1

Properties
Chemical formula	C_{6}H_{4}Cl_{2}
Molar mass	147.00 g·mol^{−1}
Appearance	Colorless liquid
Density	1.288 g/cm^{3}
Melting point	−22 to −25 °C (−8 to −13 °F; 251 to 248 K)
Boiling point	172 to 173 °C (342 to 343 °F; 445 to 446 K)
Solubility in water	Insoluble
Magnetic susceptibility (χ)	−83.19·10^{−6} cm^{3}/mol

Hazards
Flash point	65 °C (149 °F; 338 K)

Related compounds
Related compounds	1,3-Dibromobenzene
- Except where otherwise noted, data are given for materials in their standard state (at 25 °C [77 °F], 100 kPa). Infobox references

1,3-Dichlorobenzene (also known as meta-dichlorobenzene) is an aryl chloride and isomer of dichlorobenzene with the formula C_{6}H_{4}Cl_{2}. It is the least common of the three isomers of dichlorobenzene, and it is a colorless liquid that is insoluble in water. It is produced as a minor byproduct of the chlorination of benzene, but can also be prepared in a directed manner by the Sandmeyer reaction of 3-chloroaniline. It also arises from the isomerization of the other dichlorobenzenes at high temperature.

== Hazards ==
This chemical is combustible. "Hazardous decomposition products" are carbon monoxide, carbon dioxide, chlorine, hydrogen chloride gas. It is toxic to aquatic life with long-lasting effects.
