= Aryl halide =

Aromatic compounds containing Halogen atom(s) in place of Hydrogen

In organic chemistry, an aryl halide (also known as a haloarene) is an aromatic compound in which one or more hydrogen atoms directly bonded to an aromatic ring are replaced by a halogen atom (such as fluorine, chlorine, bromine, or iodine). Aryl halides are distinct from haloalkanes (alkyl halides) due to significant differences in their methods of preparation, chemical reactivity, and physical properties. The most common and important members of this class are aryl chlorides, but the group encompasses a wide range of derivatives with diverse applications in organic synthesis, pharmaceuticals, and materials science.

== Classification according to halide ==
=== Aryl fluorides ===
Aryl fluorides are used as synthetic intermediates, e.g. for the preparation of pharmaceuticals, pesticides, and liquid crystals. The conversion of diazonium salts is a well established route to aryl fluorides. Thus, anilines are precursors to aryl fluorides. In the classic Schiemann reaction, tetrafluoroborate is the fluoride donor:

[C_{6}H_{5}N^{+}_{2}]BF^{−}_{4} → C_{6}H_{5}F + N_{2} + BF_{3}

In some cases, the fluoride salt is used:

[C_{6}H_{5}N^{+}_{2}]F^{−} → C_{6}H_{5}F + N_{2}

Many commercial aryl fluorides are produced from aryl chlorides by the Halex process. The method is often used for aryl chlorides also bearing electron-withdrawing groups. Illustrative is the synthesis of 2-fluoronitrobenzene from 2-nitrochlorobenzene:

O_{2}NC_{6}H_{4}Cl + KF → O_{2}NC_{6}H_{4}F + KCl

=== Aryl chlorides ===
Aryl chlorides are the aryl halides produced on the largest scale commercially: 150,000 tons/y in the US alone (1994). Production levels are decreasing owing to environmental concerns. Chlorobenzenes are used mainly as solvents.

Friedel-Crafts halogenation or "direct chlorination" is the main synthesis route. Lewis acids, e.g. iron(III) chloride, catalyze the reactions. The most abundantly produced aryl halide, chlorobenzene, is produced by this route:

C_{6}H_{6} + Cl_{2} → C_{6}H_{5}Cl + HCl

Monochlorination of benzene is accompanied by formation of the dichlorobenzene derivatives. Arenes with electron donating groups react with halogens even in the absence of Lewis acids. For example, phenols and anilines react quickly with chlorine and bromine water to give multihalogenated products. Many detailed laboratory procedures are available. For alkylbenzene derivatives, e.g. toluene, the alkyl positions tend to be halogenated by free radical conditions, whereas ring halogenation is favored in the presence of Lewis acids. The decolouration of bromine water by electron-rich arenes is used in the bromine test.

Reaction between benzene and halogen to form an halogenobenzene

The oxychlorination of benzene has been well investigated, motivated by the avoidance of HCl as a coproduct in the direct halogenation:

4 C_{6}H_{6} + 4 HCl + O_{2} → 4 C_{6}H_{5}Cl + H_{2}O

This technology is not widely used however.

The Gatterman reaction can also be used to convert diazonium salts to chlorobenzenes using copper-based reagents. Owing to high cost of diazonium salts, this method is reserved for specialty chlorides.

=== Aryl bromides ===
The main aryl bromides produced commercially are tetrabromophthalic anhydride, decabromodiphenyl ether, and tetrabromobisphenol-A. These materials are used as flame retardants. They are produced by direct bromination of phenols and aryl ethers. Phthalic anhydride is poorly reactive toward bromine, necessitating the use of acidic media.

The Gatterman reaction can also be used to convert diazonium salts to bromobenzenes using copper-based reagents. Owing to high cost of diazonium salts, this method is reserved for specialty bromides.

=== Aryl iodides ===
Synthetic aryl iodides are used as X-ray contrast agents, but otherwise these compounds are not produced on a large scale. Aryl iodides are "easy" substrates for many reactions such as cross-coupling reactions and conversion to Grignard reagents, but they are much more expensive than the lighter, less reactive aryl chlorides and bromides.

Aryl iodides can be prepared by treating diazonium salts with iodide salts. Electron-rich arenes such as anilines and dimethoxy derivatives react directly with iodine.

Aryl lithium and aryl Grignard reagents react with iodine to give the aryl halide:

ArLi + I_{2} → ArI + LiI

This method is applicable to the preparation of all aryl halides. One limitation is that most, but not all, aryl lithium and Grignard reagents are produced from aryl halides.

== Classification according to aryl group ==
=== Halobenzenes and halobenzene derivatives ===
Although the term aryl halide includes halogenated derivatives of any aromatic compound, it commonly refers to halobenzenes, which are specifically halogenated derivatives of benzene. Groups of halobenzenes include fluorobenzenes, chlorobenzenes, bromobenzenes, and iodobenzenes, as well as mixed halobenzenes containing at least two different types of halogens bonded to the same benzene ring. There are also many halobenzene derivatives.

=== Halopyridines ===
Halopyridines are based on the aromatic compound pyridine. This includes chloropyridines and bromopyridines. Chloropyridines are important intermediates to pharmaceuticals and agrochemicals.

=== Halogenated naphthalenes ===
Halogenated naphthalenes are based on naphthalene. Polychlorinated naphthalenes were used extensively from the 1930s to 1950s in cable and capacitor production, due to their insulating, hydrophobic, and flame retardant properties, but they have since been phased out for this use due to toxicity, environmental persistence, and introduction of new materials.

== Aryl halides in nature ==
The thyroid hormones triiodothyronine (T_{3}) and thyroxine (T_{4}) are aryl iodides. A tetraiodide, T_{4} is biosynthesised by electrophilic iodination of tyrosine derivative. Synthetic T_{4} is one of the most heavily prescribed medicines in the U.S.

Many chlorinated and brominated aromatic compounds are produced by marine organisms. Chloride and bromide ions in ocean waters are the source of the halogens. Various peroxidase enzymes (e.g., bromoperoxidase) catalyze the formation of these natural aryl chlorides and bromides. Numerous are derivatives of electron-rich rings found in tyrosine, tryptophan, and various pyrroles. Some of these natural aryl halides exhibit useful medicinal properties.

Vancomycin, an important antibiotic, is a rare aryl chloride isolated from soil fungi.

The chemical structure of 6,6′-dibromoindigo, the main component of Tyrian Purple.

== Structural trends ==
The C-X distances for aryl halides follow the expected trend. These distances for fluorobenzene, chlorobenzene, bromobenzene, and methyl 4-iodobenzoate are 135.6(4), 173.90(23), 189.8(1), and 209.9 pm, respectively.

== Reactions ==
=== Substitution ===
Unlike typical alkyl halides, aryl halides typically do not participate in conventional substitution reactions. Aryl halides with electron-withdrawing groups in the ortho and para positions, can undergo S_{N}Ar reactions. For example, 2,4-dinitrochlorobenzene reacts in basic solution to give a phenol.

Unlike in most other substitution reactions, fluoride is the best leaving group, and iodide the worst. A 2018 paper indicates that this situation may actually be rather common, occurring in systems that were previously assumed to proceed via S_{N}Ar mechanisms.

=== Benzyne ===
When treated with strong base, some aryl halides often react via the intermediacy of benzynes. Benzyne is an intermediate in the reaction of chlorobenzene with strongly basic reagents such as potassium amide, even at −33 °C. It is also implicated in the conversion of chlorobenzene to phenol using sodium hydroxide, which requires high temperatures.

=== Organometallic reagent formation ===
Aryl halides react with metals, generally lithium or magnesium, to give organometallic derivatives that function as sources of aryl anions. By the metal–halogen exchange reaction, aryl halides are converted to aryl lithium compounds. Illustrative is the preparation of phenyllithium from bromobenzene using n-butyllithium (n-BuLi):

C_{6}H_{5}Br + BuLi → C_{6}H_{5}Li + BuBr

Direct formation of Grignard reagents, by adding the magnesium to the aryl halide in an ethereal solution, works well if the aromatic ring is not significantly deactivated by electron-withdrawing groups.

=== Other reactions ===
The halides can be displaced by strong nucleophiles via reactions involving radical anions. Alternatively aryl halides, especially the bromides and iodides, undergo oxidative addition, and thus are subject to Buchwald–Hartwig amination-type reactions.

=== Biodegradation ===
Rhodococcus phenolicus is a bacterium that degrades dichlorobenzene as sole carbon sources.

== Applications ==
Pigment yellow 83 is one of several aryl chloride-containing pigments.

The aryl halides produced on the largest scale are chlorobenzene and the isomers of dichlorobenzene. One major but discontinued application was the use of chlorobenzene as a solvent for dispersing the herbicide Lasso. Overall, production of aryl chlorides (also naphthyl derivatives) has been declining since the 1980s, in part due to environmental concerns. Triphenylphosphine is produced from chlorobenzene:

3 C_{6}H_{5}Cl + PCl_{3} + 6 Na → P(C_{6}H_{5})_{3} + 6 NaCl

Some prominent herbicides are aryl chlorides.

Aryl chloride-based herbicides

2,4-D

Dicamba

DDT

Pentachlorophenol

Several chlorobenzene derivatives are used as pigments and dyes.

Aryl bromides are widely used as fire-retardants. A prominent member is tetrabromobisphenol-A, which is prepared by direct bromination of the diphenol.
