= R. orientalis =

R. orientalis may refer to:

- Rhadinomyia orientalis, a picture-winged fly species
- Rhipilia orientalis, an alga species in the genus Rhipilia
- Rhynchelmis orientalis, a freshwater worm species found on Hokkaidō, Japan
- Rumex orientalis, a herb species

== See also ==
- Orientalis (disambiguation)
