= S. asiaticus =

S. asiaticus may refer to:

- Silometopoides asiaticus, a spider species in the genus Silometopoides
- Struthio asiaticus, an extinct bird species
- Stylodrilus asiaticus, a worm species in the genus Stylodrilus

== See also ==
- Asiaticus (disambiguation)
