= Lumbriculus mukoensis =

Scientific classification
- Kingdom: Animalia
- Phylum: Annelida
- Clade: Pleistoannelida
- Clade: Sedentaria
- Class: Clitellata
- Order: Lumbriculida
- Family: Lumbriculidae
- Genus: Lumbriculus
- Species: L. mukoensis

Binomial name
- Lumbriculus mukoensis Yamaguchi, 1953

Species of annelid worm

Lumbriculus mukoensis was described by Yamaguchi in 1953 from specimens collected at Mukō in Hyōgo Prefecture, Japan. It is distinguished from other Lumbriculus by the posterior location of the genital elements (starting in segment XI), and by its smaller body size. It has been proposed as a subspecies of Lumbriculus variegatus.
