= Piotr Ivanov =

Soviet embryologist and a professor (1878-1942)

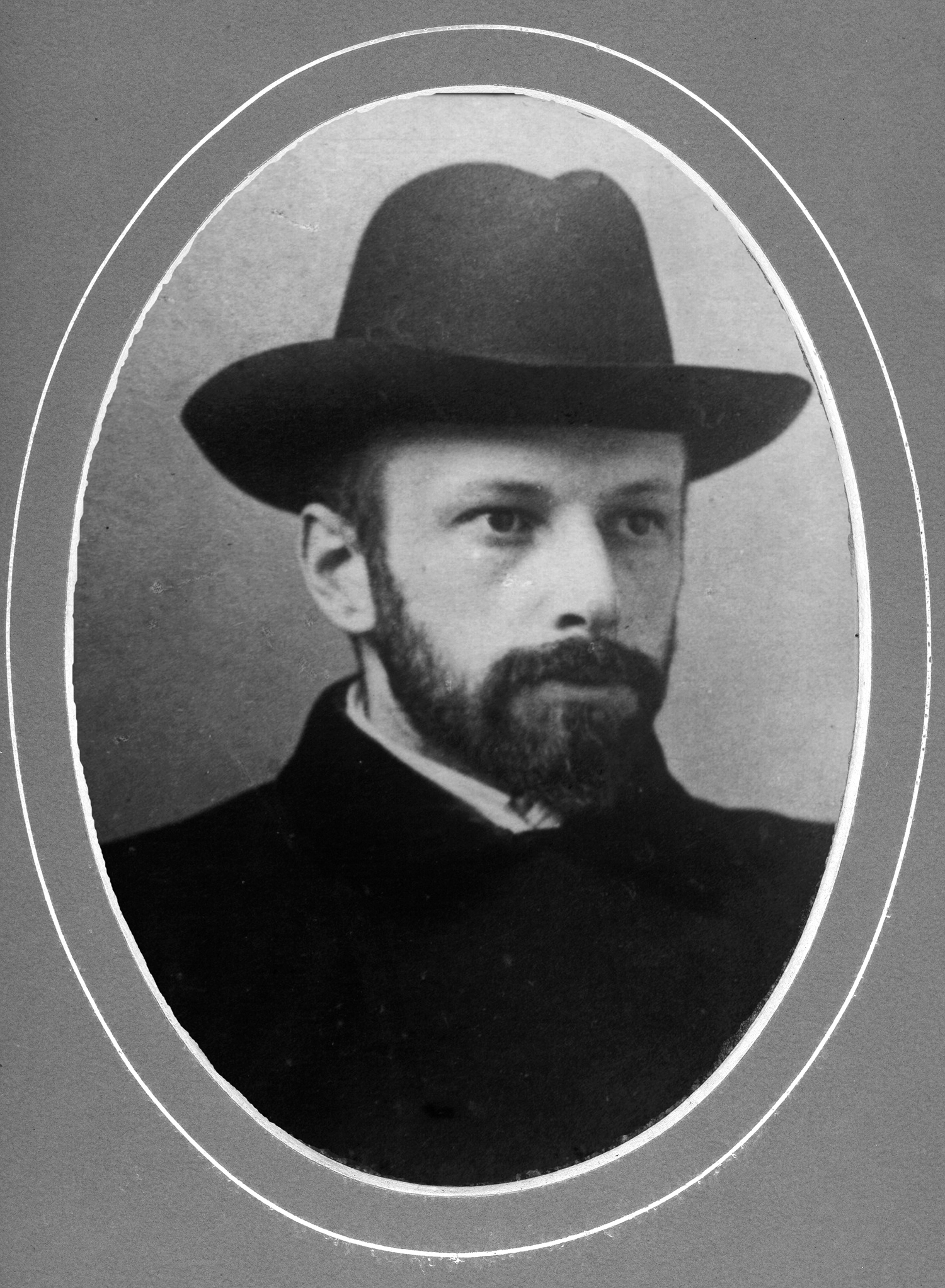
Professor P. P. Ivanov

Piotr Pavlovich Ivanov (Russian: Петр Павлович Иванов; 9 April 1878 – 15 February 1942) was a Soviet embryologist and a professor. He studied segmentation in annelids and arthropods and proposed the differentiation of two kinds of segments in segmented organisms and the developmental (or ontogenetic) idea of heteronomous metamery where several segments fuse to perform a common function.

== Life and work ==
Ivanov was born in St. Petersburg where his father Pavel worked in the Volga-Kama bank. He graduated from the 1st classical gymnasium in 1896 and joined St. Petersburg University where he studied zoology under Vladimir Shevyakov. His research was on the regeneration of segments in the worm Lumbriculus variegatus for which he received a gold medal in 1901. He then went to the biological research station, Naples to study regeneration in marine annelids. In 1906 he received a A.O. Kovalevsky scholarship to visit the Sunda Islands and collected a large number of invertebrates and made studies of Limulus mollucanus, Xiphosura and Scolopendra. In 1911 he studied in Munich under Richard Hertwig. His master's thesis at St. Petersburg University was on a comparative study of regeneration in annelids. In 1919 he became a professor at St. Petersburg University and began an embryology laboratory in 1922. In 1932 he moved to the Institute of Experimental Medicine and became the head of experimental embryology. He received a doctorate in 1932. He published a book on general and comparative embryology in 1937 in which he proposed the theory of primary heteronomy which he had begun in 1928. Ivanov's ideas were proposed from 1928 onwards in a series of papers. He identified two kinds of segments which varied in their origin, the larval somites formed from germinal bands derived from mesoderm, and the post-larval somites formed from the growth zone. He noted that the larval somites (also called protosomites) are usually found anterior to the post-larval ones and that regeneration is possibly only in those parts formed from the post-larval somites (or eusomites). Primary heteronomy or the fusion of segments for function involve only the post-larval somites. He considered the larval somites to be more evolutionarily ancient and noted that some segmented animals lacked eusomites. The distinction between the larval and post-larval somites is not universally accepted.

Ivanov's school of students who became embryologists of note included P. G. Svetlov, O. M. Ivanova-Kazas, L. N. Zhinkin, D. M. Steinberg, V. A. Tsvileneva, A. G. Knorre, S I. Bogomolov and K. A. Meshcherskaya.

During World War II, he was evacuated from St. Petersburg to Kostroma but died in the harsh winter.
