= C2H7NO2 =

The molecular formula C_{2}H_{7}NO_{2} may refer to:

- Ammonium acetate
- Methylammonium formate
