= Tribromobenzene =

Tribromobenzenes are a group of bromobenzenes with the formula C_{6}H_{3}Br_{3}, consisting of three bromine atoms bonded to a central benzene ring.

There are three isomers of tribromobenzene:

Tribromobenzene isomers
Common name and systematic name	1,2,3-Tribromobenzene	1,2,4-Tribromobenzene	1,3,5-Tribromobenzene
Structure
Molecular formula	C_{6}H_{3}Br_{3}
Molar mass	314.802 g/mol
Appearance	colorless solid
CAS number	[608-21-9]	[615-54-3]	[626-39-1]
Properties
Solubility in water	practically insoluble
Melting point	87.5 °C	41–43 °C	122 °C
Boiling point		274–276 °C	271 °C

== See also ==
- Trichlorobenzene
