= Lumbriculus japonicus =

Scientific classification
- Kingdom: Animalia
- Phylum: Annelida
- Clade: Pleistoannelida
- Clade: Sedentaria
- Class: Clitellata
- Order: Lumbriculida
- Family: Lumbriculidae
- Genus: Lumbriculus
- Species: L. japonicus

Binomial name
- Lumbriculus japonicus Yamaguchi, 1936

Species of annelid

Lumbriculus japonicus is an oligochaete originally described by Yamaguchi in 1936 from locations on Hokkaidō. It is distinguished from other species mainly by the location of the genital elements, which are positioned two segments posteriorly to their position in L. variegatus.
