= Hrabea =

Scientific classification
- Kingdom: Animalia
- Phylum: Annelida
- Clade: Pleistoannelida
- Clade: Sedentaria
- Class: Clitellata
- Order: Lumbriculida
- Family: Lumbriculidae
- Genus: Hrabea; Yamaguchi, 1936
- Species: H. ogumai

Binomial name
- Hrabea ogumai Yamaguchi, 1936

Genus of freshwater annelid worms

Hrabea ogumai is a species of oligochaete worm originally described by Yamaguchi in 1936 from specimens collected from subterranean waters in Sapporo. The genus is named after the great oligochaete specialist Dr. Sergej Hrabe, and the species after Prof. K. Oguma.

The body of Hrabea is 7–8 centimetres (2.8–3.1 in) long, and consists of 146–183 segments. The body wall is thin and transparent, but when illuminated, shows a light green tint. It swims actively by lateral undulating movements. The setae are one-pointed.

Hrabea ogumai is similar to Stylodrilus subgenus Bythonomus, but lacks the transversal vessels of the middle and posterior parts of the body, has one testis and male funnel (in segment X) instead of two (in segments IX and X), and has a pear-shaped atrium, to which the vas deferens is connected at the apical end, rather than at the lower half.
