= Tatriella =

Scientific classification
- Domain: Eukaryota
- Kingdom: Animalia
- Phylum: Annelida
- Clade: Pleistoannelida
- Clade: Sedentaria
- Class: Clitellata
- Order: Lumbriculida
- Family: Lumbriculidae
- Genus: Tatriella; Hrabĕ, 1936

Genus of annelid worms

Tatriella is a genus of annelids belonging to the family Lumbriculidae.

The species of this genus are found in Europe.

Species:

- Tatriella longiatriata Popčenko, 1976
- Tatriella slovenica Hrabĕ, 1939
