= Phytomer =

Phytomers are functional units of a plant, continually produced by root and shoot meristems throughout a plant's vegetative life-cycle. Increases in a phytomer can be measured using the rate of phyllochron (rate of appearance of leaves on a shoot). Related to the phyllochron is the plastochron, which is the rate of leaf primordia initiation. Since many more leaf primordia are initiated than leaves develop, the plastochron develops at a much faster rate (sometimes as much as twice as quickly) as the phyllochron.

Initially, a young plant will only produce phytomers at its apical meristems but later in development, secondary meristems will begin to form and phytomers will be formed on this lateral plant growth.
