= Phyllochron =

The phyllochron is the intervening period between the sequential emergence of leaves on the main stem of a plant, also rendered as leaf appearance^{−1}. This measurement is used by botanists and agronomists to describe the growth and development of plants, especially cereals. The term phyllochron was first described in 1966. The interval between leaf appearances can be recorded in both standard measurements of time as well as thermal time (e.g. growing degree units). One phytomer unit is added over the course of one phyllochron. No significantly robust equation to predict phyllochrons has been developed.

== Variation ==
Increases in phyllochron in cereals correlates with growing degree units in a slightly curvilinear fashion. In all cultivars of cereals, fluctuations in temperature are the primary factor that affects the length of the phyllochron. Less important secondary factors emerge in a number of different and sometimes contradictory studies on phyllochron response to variation in light, CO_{2} level, irrigation, nitrogen availability, salinity, soil properties, planting depth, planting time, and genotype. In cereals, the phyllochron may vary in speed between the main stem and the tillers. The phyllochron may or may not be equal to the length of time taken for one leaf to grow. It is more accurate to determine the value in a laboratory study than in the field, as field studies have not always noted the non-linear relationship of temperature and leaf appearance.

== See also ==
- Phenology
- Phytomer
- Plant development
- Plastochron
