= Eclipidrilus =

Scientific classification
- Kingdom: Animalia
- Phylum: Annelida
- Clade: Pleistoannelida
- Clade: Sedentaria
- Class: Clitellata
- Order: Lumbriculida
- Family: Lumbriculidae
- Genus: Eclipidrilus; Eisen, 1881

Synonyms
- Mesoporodrilus Smith, 1896

Genus of annelids

Eclipidrilus is a genus of annelids belonging to the family Lumbriculidae.

The species of this genus are found in Europe and Northern America.

Species:

- Eclipidrilus asymmetricus (Smith, 1896)
- Eclipidrilus breviatriatus Fend & Lenat, 2012
- Eclipidrilus daneus Cook, 1966
- Eclipidrilus fontanus Wassel, 1984
- Eclipidrilus frigidus Eisen, 1881
- Eclipidrilus ithys Brinkhurst, 1998
- Eclipidrilus lacustris (Verrill, 1871)
- Eclipidrilus levanidovi Sokolskaya, 1977
- Eclipidrilus macphersonae Fend & Lenat, 2012
- Eclipidrilus microthecus Fend & Lenat, 2012
- Eclipidrilus pacificus Fend, 2005
- Eclipidrilus palustris (Smith, 1900)
