= Yamaguchia =

Yamaguchia toyensis

Scientific classification
- Kingdom: Animalia
- Phylum: Annelida
- Clade: Pleistoannelida
- Clade: Sedentaria
- Class: Clitellata
- Order: Lumbriculida
- Family: Lumbriculidae
- Genus: Yamaguchia
- Species: Y. toyensis

Binomial name
- Yamaguchia toyensis Fend & Ohtaka, 2004

Species of freshwater annelid worm

Yamaguchia toyensis is one of many aquatic oligochaetes belonging to the family Lumbriculidae discovered on the island of Hokkaidō, Japan, which seems to be one of three "hotspots" of lumbriculid diversity (the others being the Rocky Mountains and Lake Baikal). The genus named after the great oligochaete taxonomist Professor Hideji Yamaguchi.

Y. toyensis was originally collected from profundal parts of Lake Tōya, Hokkaido (after which it is named), and is among the shortest of the lumbriculids (7–11 mm). It is uncertain where in the phylogeny of the lumbriculids Y. toyensis belongs. It seems to lack novel characters with which to place it unambiguously, but has a combination of features not found in other genera of the family: testes and atria in segment X, a single, prosoporous male funnel per atrium, and spermathecae in segment XI.
