= Metamerism (biology) =

Segmented body with a serial repetition of organs

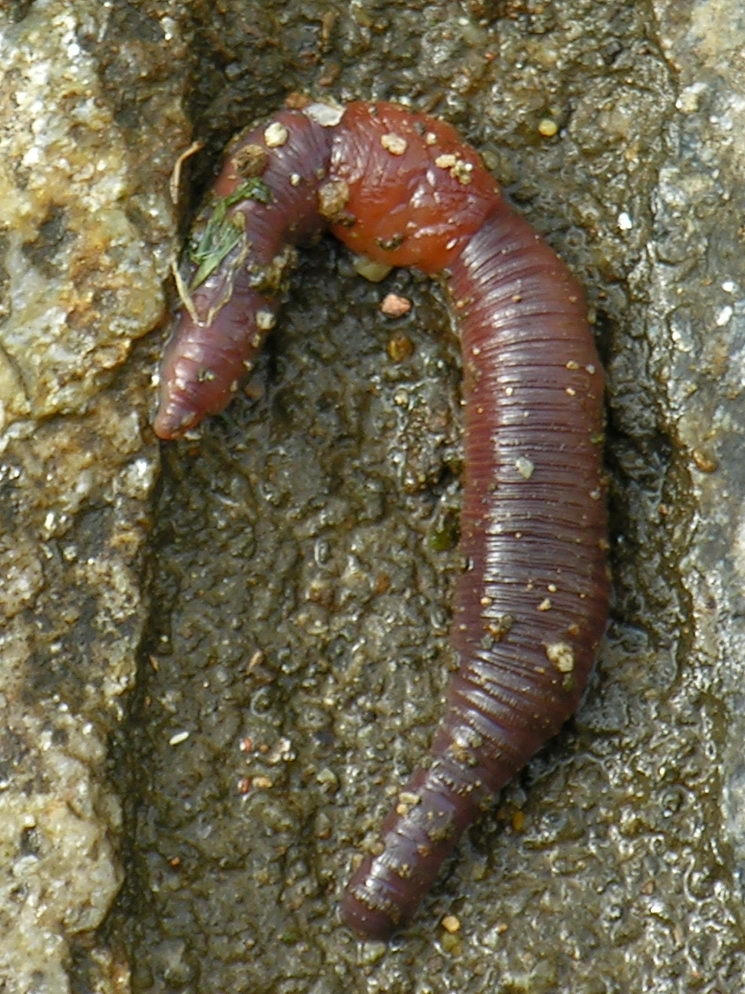
Earthworms are a classic example of biological homonymous metamery – the property of repeating body segments with distinct regions

In biology, metamerism is the phenomenon of having a linear series of body segments fundamentally similar in structure, though not all such structures are entirely alike in any single life form because some of them perform special functions. In animals, metameric segments are referred to as somites or metameres. In plants, they are referred to as metamers or, more concretely, phytomers.

== In animals ==
In animals, zoologists define metamerism as a mesodermal event resulting in serial repetition of unit subdivisions of ectoderm and mesoderm products. Endoderm is not involved in metamerism. Segmentation is not the same concept as metamerism: segmentation can be confined only to ectodermally derived tissue, e.g., in the Cestoda tapeworms. Metamerism is far more important biologically since it results in metameres – also called somites – that play a critical role in advanced locomotion.

One can divide metamerism into two main categories:

- homonomous metamery is a strict serial succession of metameres. It can be grouped into two more classifications known as pseudometamerism and true metamerism. An example of pseudometamerism is in the class Cestoda. The tapeworm is composed of many repeating segments – primarily for reproduction and basic nutrient exchange. Each segment acts independently from the others, which is why it is not considered true metamerism. Another worm, the earthworm in phylum Annelida, can exemplify true metamerism. In each segment of the worm, a repetition of organs and muscle tissue can be found. What differentiates the Annelids from Cestoda is that the segments in the earthworm all work together for the whole organism. It is believed that segmentation evolved for many reasons, including a higher degree of motion. Taking the earthworm, for example: the segmentation of the muscular tissue allows the worm to move in an inching pattern. The circular muscles work to allow the segments to elongate one by one, and the longitudinal muscles then work to shorten the elongated segments. This pattern continues down the entirety of the worm, allowing it to inch along a surface. Each segment is allowed to work independently, but towards the movement of the whole worm.
- heteronomous metamery is the condition where metameres have grouped together to perform similar tasks. The extreme example of this is the insect head (5 metameres), thorax (3 metameres), and abdomen (11 metameres, not all discernible in all insects). The process that results in the grouping of metameres is called "tagmatization", and each grouping is called a tagma (plural: tagmata). In organisms with highly derived tagmata, such as the insects, much of the metamerism within a tagma may not be trivially distinguishable. It may have to be sought in structures that do not necessarily reflect the grouped metameric function (eg. the ladder nerve system or somites do not reflect the unitary structure of a thorax).

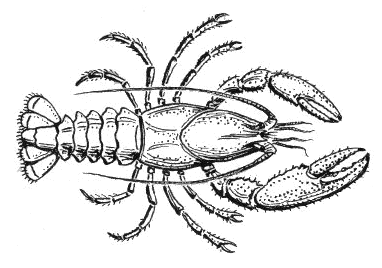
Segments of a crayfish exhibit metamerism

In addition, an animal may be classified as "pseudometameric", meaning that it has clear internal metamerism but no corresponding external metamerism – as is seen, for example, in Monoplacophora.

Humans and other chordates are conspicuous examples of organisms that have metameres intimately grouped into tagmata. In the Chordata the metameres of each tagma are fused to such an extent that few repetitive features are directly visible. Intensive investigation is necessary to discern the metamerism in the tagmata of such organisms. Examples of detectable evidence of vestigially metameric structures include branchial arches and cranial nerves.

Some schemes regard the concept of metamerism as one of the four principles of construction of the human body, common to many animals, along with general bilateral symmetry (or zygomorphism), pachymerism (or tubulation), and stratification. More recent schemes also include three other concepts: segmentation (conceived as different from metamerism), polarity and endocrinosity.

== In plants ==
A metamer is one of several segments that share in the construction of a shoot, or into which a shoot may be conceptually (at least) resolved. In the metameristic model, a plant consists of a series of 'phytons' or phytomers, each consisting of an internode and its upper node with the attached leaf. As Asa Gray (1850) wrote:

The branch, or simple stem itself, is manifestly an assemblage of similar parts, placed one above another in a continuous series, developed one from another in successive generations. Each one of these joints of stem, bearing its leaf at the apex, is a plant element; or as we term it a phyton,—a potential plant, having all the organs of vegetation, namely, stem, leaf, and in its downward development even a root, or its equivalent. This view of the composition of the plant, though by no means a new one, has not been duly appreciated. I deem it essential to a correct philosophical understanding of the plant.

Some plants, particularly grasses, demonstrate a rather clear metameric construction, but many others either lack discrete modules or their presence is more arguable. Phyton theory has been criticized as an over-ingenious, academic conception which bears little relation to reality. Eames (1961) concluded that "concepts of the shoot as consisting of a series of structural units have been obscured by the dominance of the stem- and leaf-theory. Anatomical units like these do not exist: the shoot is the basic unit." Even so, others still consider comparative study along the length of the metameric organism to be a fundamental aspect of plant morphology.

Metameric conceptions generally segment the vegetative axis into repeating units along its length, but constructs based on other divisions are possible. The pipe model theory conceives of the plant (especially trees) as made up of unit pipes ('metamers'), each supporting a unit amount of photosynthetic tissue. Vertical metamers are also suggested in some desert shrubs in which the stem is modified into isolated strips of xylem, each having continuity from root to shoot. This may enable the plant to abscise a large part of its shoot system in response to drought, without damaging the remaining part.

In vascular plants, the shoot system differs fundamentally from the root system in that the former shows a metameric construction (repeated units of organs; stem, leaf, and inflorescence), while the latter does not. The plant embryo represents the first metamer of the shoot in spermatophytes or seed plants.

Plants (especially trees) are considered to have a 'modular construction,' a module being an axis in which the entire sequence of aerial differentiation is carried out from the initiation of the meristem to the onset of sexuality (e.g. flower or cone development) which completes its development. These modules are considered to be developmental units, not necessarily structural.

== See also ==
- Metamerism (disambiguation) (for other meanings)
- Segmentation
- Phytomer
