= 2,4,6-Tribromoaniline =

Chemical compound

- Skeletal formula

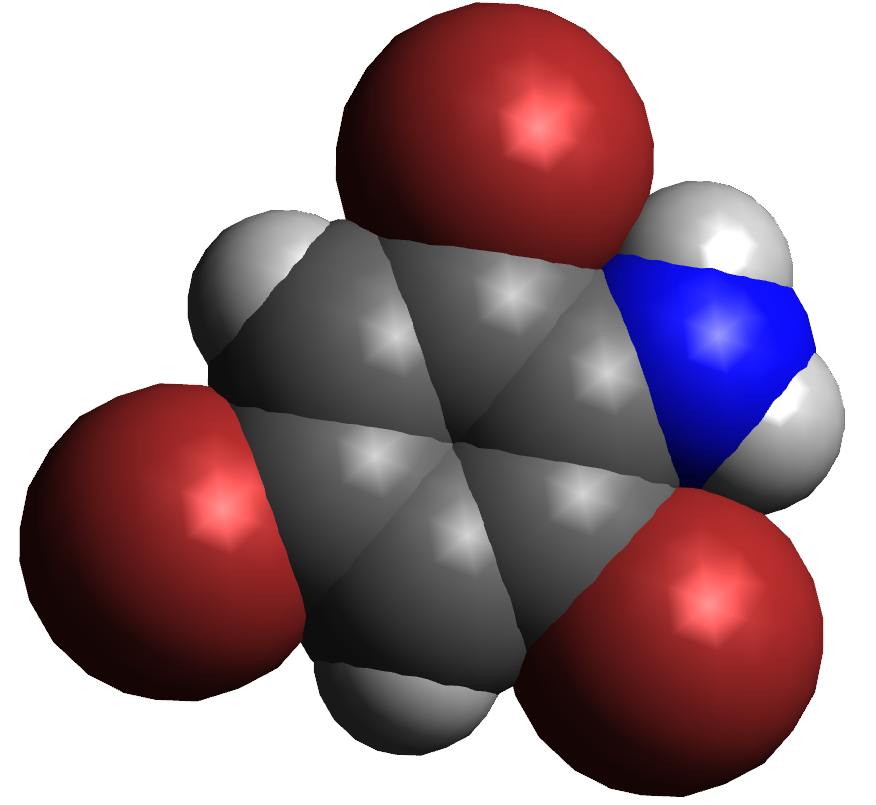
The space-filling model of 2,4,6-tribromoaniline
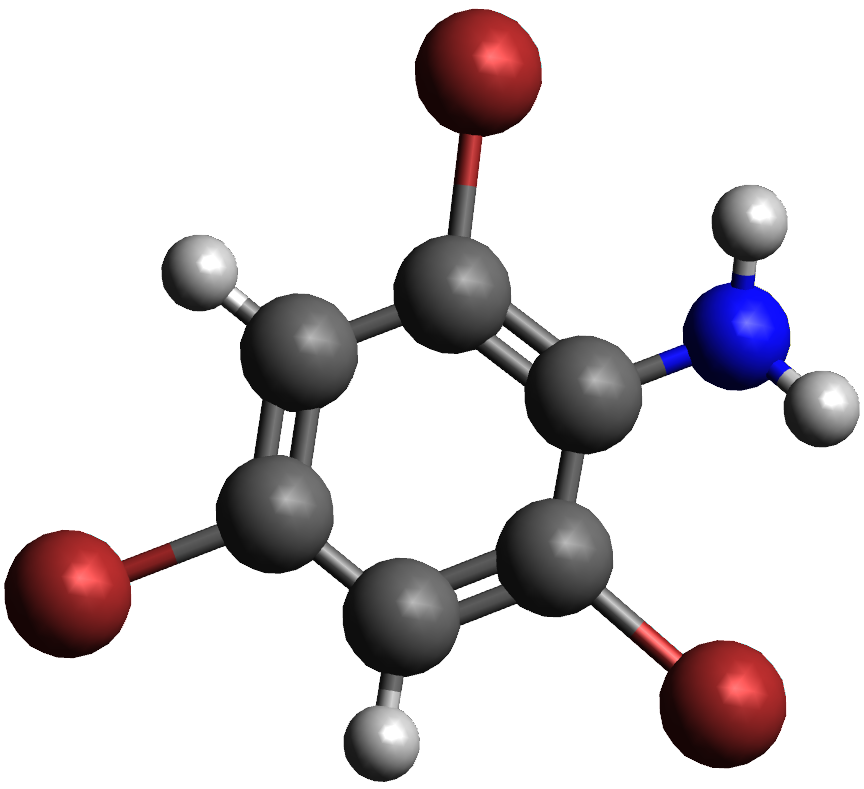
The ball and stick model of 2,4,6-tribromoaniline

Names
- Preferred IUPAC name 2,4,6-Tribromoaniline

Identifiers
CAS Number	147-82-0
3D model (JSmol)	Interactive image
ChemSpider	21106171
ECHA InfoCard	100.005.183
EC Number	205-700-1
PubChem CID	8986
UNII	0C2N8WIL3B
CompTox Dashboard (EPA)	DTXSID5051733
- InChI: InChI=1S/C6H4Br3N/c7-3-1-4(8)6(10)5(9)2-3/h1-2H,10H2 Key: GVPODVKBTHCGFU-UHFFFAOYSA-N
- SMILES: C1=C(C=C(C(=C1Br)N)Br)Br

Properties
Chemical formula	C_{6}H_{4}Br_{3}N
Molar mass	329.817 g·mol^{−1}
Melting point	120 °C (248 °F; 393 K)
Boiling point	300 °C (572 °F; 573 K)
Solubility in water	Insoluble

Hazards
- Occupational safety and health (OHS/OSH)
Main hazards	Harmful, Corrosive, Toxic
- GHS labelling
Pictograms	(GHS05: Corrosive) (GHS06: Toxic) (GHS07: Exclamation mark) (GHS08: Health hazard)
Signal word	Danger
Hazard statements	H301, H302, H311, H312, H315, H318, H319, H331, H332, H373
Precautionary statements	P260, P264, P270, P271, P280, P301+P310, P301+P312, P302+P352, P304+P312, P304+P340, P305+P351+P338, P310, P311, P312, P314, P321, P322, P330, P332+P313, P337+P313, P361, P362, P363, P403+P233, P405, P501
NFPA 704 (fire diamond)	2 0 0
Flash point	Non-flammable
Autoignition temperature	Non-flammable
- Except where otherwise noted, data are given for materials in their standard state (at 25 °C [77 °F], 100 kPa). Infobox references

2,4,6-Tribromoaniline is a brominated derivative of aniline with the formula C_{6}H_{4}Br_{3}N. It is used in organic synthesis of pharmaceuticals, agrochemicals and fire-extinguishing agents.

== Synthesis ==
2,4,6-Tribromoaniline can be prepared by treating bromine water with aniline in a solution of acetic acid or dilute hydrochloric acid:

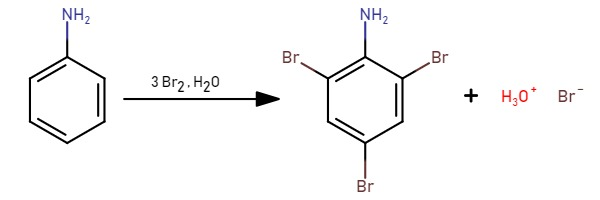
By reacting bromine with aniline in water, a white precipitate (2,4,6-tribromoaniline) immediately forms.

== Reactions ==
Diazotization, then reaction with ethanol to replace the diazonium group with hydrogen, gives 1,3,5-tribromobenzene.

== See also ==
- Bromine test
- 4-Bromoaniline
- 2,4,6-Tribromoanisole
- 2,4,6-Tribromophenol
