= Lamprodrilus =

Scientific classification
- Kingdom: Animalia
- Phylum: Annelida
- Clade: Pleistoannelida
- Clade: Sedentaria
- Class: Clitellata
- Order: Lumbriculida
- Family: Lumbriculidae
- Genus: Lamprodrilus; Michaelsen, 1901

Genus of freshwater annelid worms

Lamprodrilus is a genus of annelids belonging to the family Lumbriculidae.

Species:

- Lamprodrilus achaetus
- Lamprodrilus isoporus
