= Metamerism =

Metamerism may refer to:

- Metamerism (biology), in zoology and developmental biology, the property of having repeated segments, as in annelids
- Metamerism (color), in colorimetry, a perceived matching of colors that, based on differences in spectral power distribution, do not actually match
- In chemistry, the chemical property of having the same number and type of atomic components in different arrangements (see structural isomer)
