= Rhynchelmis orientalis =

Scientific classification
- Kingdom: Animalia
- Phylum: Annelida
- Clade: Pleistoannelida
- Clade: Sedentaria
- Class: Clitellata
- Order: Lumbriculida
- Family: Lumbriculidae
- Genus: Rhynchelmis
- Species: R. orientalis

Binomial name
- Rhynchelmis orientalis Yamaguchi, 1936

Species of freshwater annelid worm

Rhynchelmis orientalis is a freshwater worm.

It was described by Yamaguchi in 1936 from specimens collected on Hokkaidō. It can be distinguished from other species in the genus by the very long spermathecae running in several posterior segments into spermsacs, disconnected to the alimentary tract, as well as a vestigial anterior vas deferens. The genital elements are positioned in a fashion similar to that of Rhynchelmis vejdovskyi.

Rhynchelmis orientalis is pinkish to purplish, of variable size. The number of segments is between 196 and 245, and the setae are one-pointed.
