= Lumbriculus ambiguus =

Scientific classification
- Kingdom: Animalia
- Phylum: Annelida
- Clade: Pleistoannelida
- Clade: Sedentaria
- Class: Clitellata
- Order: Lumbriculida
- Family: Lumbriculidae
- Genus: Lumbriculus
- Species: L. ambiguus

Binomial name
- Lumbriculus ambiguus Holmquist, 1976

Species of freshwater annelid worm

Lumbriculus ambiguus was described by Holmquist in 1976, based on material collected in northern Alaska. Like L. genitosetosus, L. ambiguus was initially placed in the genus Thinodrilus along with L. inconstans, but this genus is generally not recognised today. Its genital characters vary greatly between individuals, but certain features (such as the location of the atria in segment VIII) appear to be constant.
