= Trichodrilus =

Scientific classification
- Kingdom: Animalia
- Phylum: Annelida
- Clade: Pleistoannelida
- Clade: Sedentaria
- Class: Clitellata
- Order: Lumbriculida
- Family: Lumbriculidae
- Genus: Trichodrilus; Claparède, 1862

Genus of freshwater annelid worms

Trichodrilus is a genus of Lumbriculidae.

The genus was described in 1862 by René-Édouard Claparède.

It has cosmopolitan distribution.

Species:

- Trichodrilus allobrogum (Claparède, 1862)
- Trichodrilus angelieri (Giani & Rodriguez, 1994)
- Trichodrilus aporophorus (Popčenko, 1976)
- Trichodrilus seirei (Timm, 1979)
