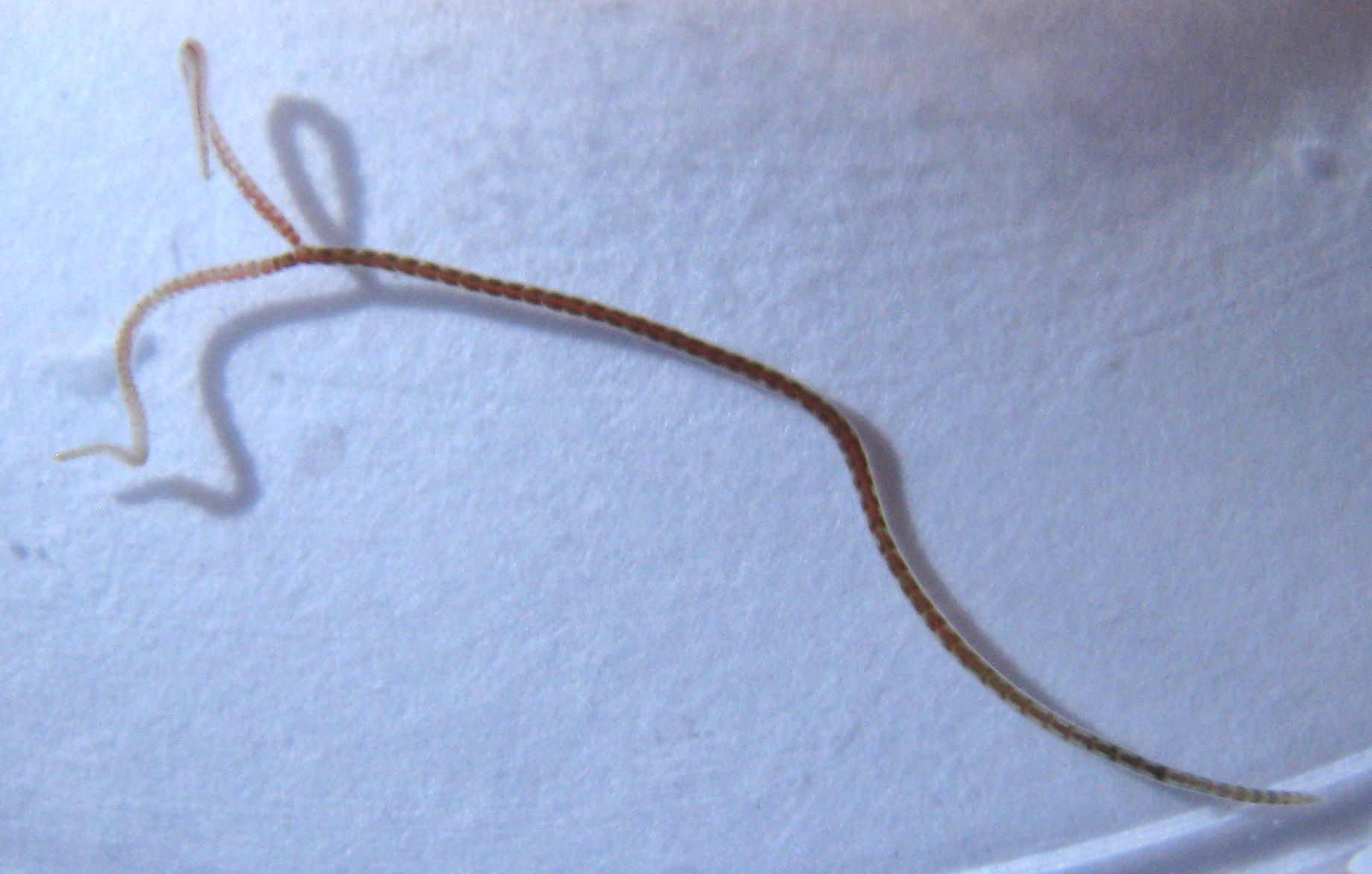
- This specimen has two tails, possibly because an injury to the tail caused it to grow a replacement.

Scientific classification
- Kingdom: Animalia
- Phylum: Annelida
- Clade: Pleistoannelida
- Clade: Sedentaria
- Class: Clitellata
- Order: Lumbriculida
- Family: Lumbriculidae
- Genus: Lumbriculus; Grube, 1844

Species
- See #Species

= Lumbriculus =

Genus of freshwater annelid worms

Lumbriculus is a genus of oligochaete annelids.

== Species ==
Species:

- Lumbriculus alexandrovi Popchenko, 1976
- Lumbriculus ambiguus Holmquist, 1976
- Lumbriculus caribensis Botea, 1983
- Lumbriculus genitosetosus Holmquist, 1976
- Lumbriculus illex Timm & Rodriguez, 1994
- Lumbriculus inconstans (Smith, 1895)
- Lumbriculus japonicus Yamaguchi, 1936
- Lumbriculus kolymensis Morev, 1982
- Lumbriculus lacustris 1880
- Lumbriculus mukoensis Yamaguchi, 1953
- Lumbriculus multiatriatus Yamaguchi, 1937
- Lumbriculus olgae Sokolskaya, 1976
- Lumbriculus pellucidus Gouret, 1885
- Lumbriculus sachalinicus Sokolskaya, 1967
- Lumbriculus tetraporophorus Popčhenko, 1976
- Lumbriculus variegatus (Müller, 1774)
