= Leaf plastochron index =

Measure of plant leaf age based on morphological development

Leaf plastochron index is a measure of plant leaf age based on morphological development (the plastochron). It is useful in studying plant development requiring destructive measurement on multiple individuals. By measuring a metric against morphological age, instead of chronological time, one can reduce variations occurring between individuals, thus allowing greater focus on variations due to development.

== What is the leaf plastochron index? ==
The leaf plastochron index, also referred to simply as the plastochron index (PI) as it is derived from, is a demography formula used to determine the developmental age and growing rate of a leaf or other growing plant organ. This formula was useful when first introduced as it allowed scientists to be able to track the progression and growth of a plant. According to American Journal of Botany, the typical variation of the formula for the plastochron index is as follows;

$P.I.=n+{(lnL_n-lnR)\over (lnL_n-lnL_{n+1}) }$

However, another common variation as according to Hans Burström's book Growth and Growth Substances/Wachstum und Wuchsstoffe, the leaf plastochron index for a certain leaf on a plant is as follows;

$(L.P.I)_a=(P.I.)-a=n-a+{logL_n-log_10 \over logL_n-logL_{n+1}}$

This is derived from Burström's variation of the plastochron index which is as follows;

$P.I.=n+{logL_n-log_{10} \over logL_n-logL_{n+1}}$

Other data, not including morphological features, that can be used to determine the leaf's developmental age include uptake of oxygen, weight, chlorophyll, etc.

== How to use the leaf plastochron index ==
To use the plastochron index, it is important to be able to understand how to use the formula. The following is the key to use the typical variation of the formula;

“n” is the leaf's sequential index (or serial) number. This number is increasing in the acropetal direction. If the seedling's leaves of the organ are the source of study, n = 0.

“R” is the reference length of the leaf.

“$L_n$” is the length of the leaf that is longer, or equal, to the reference length.

“$L_{n+1}$” is the length of which is shorter than the reference length.

However, when using the formula supplied by the American Journal of Botany there are multiple assumptions or requirements of the leaf that is being studied for the calculation to be accurate. Erickson and Michelini dictate that the “organ growth must be exponential” meaning the leaf must be growing. Also, “successive organs must be growing at the same relative rates” meaning the measurement will not equate to other plant growth unless they share the same growth rate even if they are co-dependently growing. Finally, “Successive plastochrons must be equal, where here, plastochrons are defined as the time intervals between the attainment of length R by successive organs” meaning that some research of the leaf's reference length is needed for the formula to be verifiable.

In Burström's variation, he uses a Xanthium plant as an example which was 10 mm (thus, why 10 was used as the reference unit). This was used to show that the plastochron age of this plant is 0. A plant longer than this would have a positive number for its plastochron age and an organ shorter than the reference unit of 10 mm will have a negative plastochron age.

== Leaf plastochron index in action ==
An example of the leaf plastochron index in action is Philip R. Larson and J. G. Isebrands’ article The Plastochron Index as Applied to Developmental Studies of Cottonwood. A cottonwood leaf was the organ used for this research as this plant has uniform rates of growth, meaning it falls under the requirements needed for the formula's verifiability. Two tests were conducted; the first test showed the results of the plastochron intervals ranging between 2-2.76 days but the second test was to calculate the statistical models of the leaf plastochron indexes for all 5 size classes. The five size classes were directly related to the five dependent variables of their study; leaf length, leaf area, vessels per internode, vessels per petiole and leaf weight (dry).

This study shows how the leaf plastochron index can be used within scientific research to explore and predict certain developmental events of a leaf or other plant organ's life cycle through a non destructive method of morphological feature identification.

Another example of the leaf plastochron index in action is O.E. Ade-Ademilua C.E.J. Botha and R.J. Strasser's South African Journal of Botany article A re-evaluation of plastochron index determination in peas -- a case for using leaflet length. For this study the following variation of the leaf plastochron index formula was used;

$P.I.=n+{logL_n-log\lambda \over logL_n-logL_{n+1}}$

This study was conducted in order to determine whether the leaf plastochron index works for pea plants (Pisum sativum).The researchers’ results showed that the pea plant (Pisum sativum) met all the requirements needed to use the leaf plastochron index formula in a verifiable manner when finding plastochron age through leaf length. However, these results can only be deduced if early development is measured successfully. This shows that the leaf plastochron index can measure successive pairs of leaflets in pea plants (Pisum sativum).

== Creators of leaf plastochron index ==
This formula was introduced in 1957 by scientists Ralph O. Erickson and Francis J. Michelini, making this scientific formula over 60 years old. Erickson and Michelini's formula was first published for The Journal of March in the American Journal of Botany. Although Erickson and Michelini were responsible for introducing the formula, the concept of the plastochron being used as a unit of measurement was inspired by scientist Askenasy originally in 1880. Other names that have contributed to the use of the plastochron are Schmidt in 1924 and Esau in 1953 and again in 1965.

Dr. Ralph O. Erickson was born in Duluth, Minnesota, in 1914. He received an education from Gustavus Adolphus College in 1939 and Washington University in St. Louis where he inevitably attained his Ph.D. in 1944. Although he first began teaching at Rochester in 1944 until 1947, much of his career was spent at the University of Pennsylvania where he received his professorship between 1949 until 1985. His primary focus of study was on plant morphology, which he stated in his autobiography that developmental plant morphology was actually one of his most enjoyable courses to teach. Erickson went on to write in his autobiography that when conversing with Michelini that he “Found [himself] writing the formula for the plastochron index on the blackboard, as if by inspiration. The plastochron index has now been used by many authors, including [themselves], in a variety of ways.” He later went on to receive his Guggenheim Fellowship for his work in plant physiology where he used the plastochron index in order to determine and assess the temperature and light effects on the developmental growth of the plants. Erickson died in March 2006.

Dr. Francis J. Michelini was born in Clifton, New Jersey in 1925. He received an education at Seton Hall College, the University of Delaware and the University of Pennsylvania where he received his Doctorate of Philosophy degree in Biological science. This was where he met Ralph O. Erickson. He began his teaching career at Wilkes College and received his Professorship of Biology in 1963. He was announced as the second President of Wilkes College in 1970 and later served as President of the Commission for Independent Colleges and Universities. In 1957, Michelini published his article The Plastochron Index with Ralph O. Erickson. Michelini died in September 2019.
