= Lumbriculus genitosetosus =

Scientific classification
- Kingdom: Animalia
- Phylum: Annelida
- Clade: Pleistoannelida
- Clade: Sedentaria
- Class: Clitellata
- Order: Lumbriculida
- Family: Lumbriculidae
- Genus: Lumbriculus
- Species: L. genitosetosus

Binomial name
- Lumbriculus genitosetosus Holmquist, 1976

Species of freshwater annelid worm

Lumbriculus genitosetosus was described by Holmquist in 1976 from almost 2,000 individuals collected in Northern Alaska. Initially, Holmquist revived the genus Thinodrilus (previously established by Smith in 1895 for Th. inconstans) for L. genitosetosus, Lumbriculus inconstans and Lumbriculus ambiguus on the basis of the Lumbriculus-species having only one pair of vas deferens and sperm funnels per atrium, whereas the Thinodrilus-species have two (one in the anterior end and one in the posterior); this division is, however, not generally recognised today, even if Thinodrilus may be a valid subgenus.

Lumbriculus genitosetosus, as the name suggests, can be recognised by its modified male genital setae, unique within the Lumbriculidae.
