= 1,3,5-Trichlorobenzene =

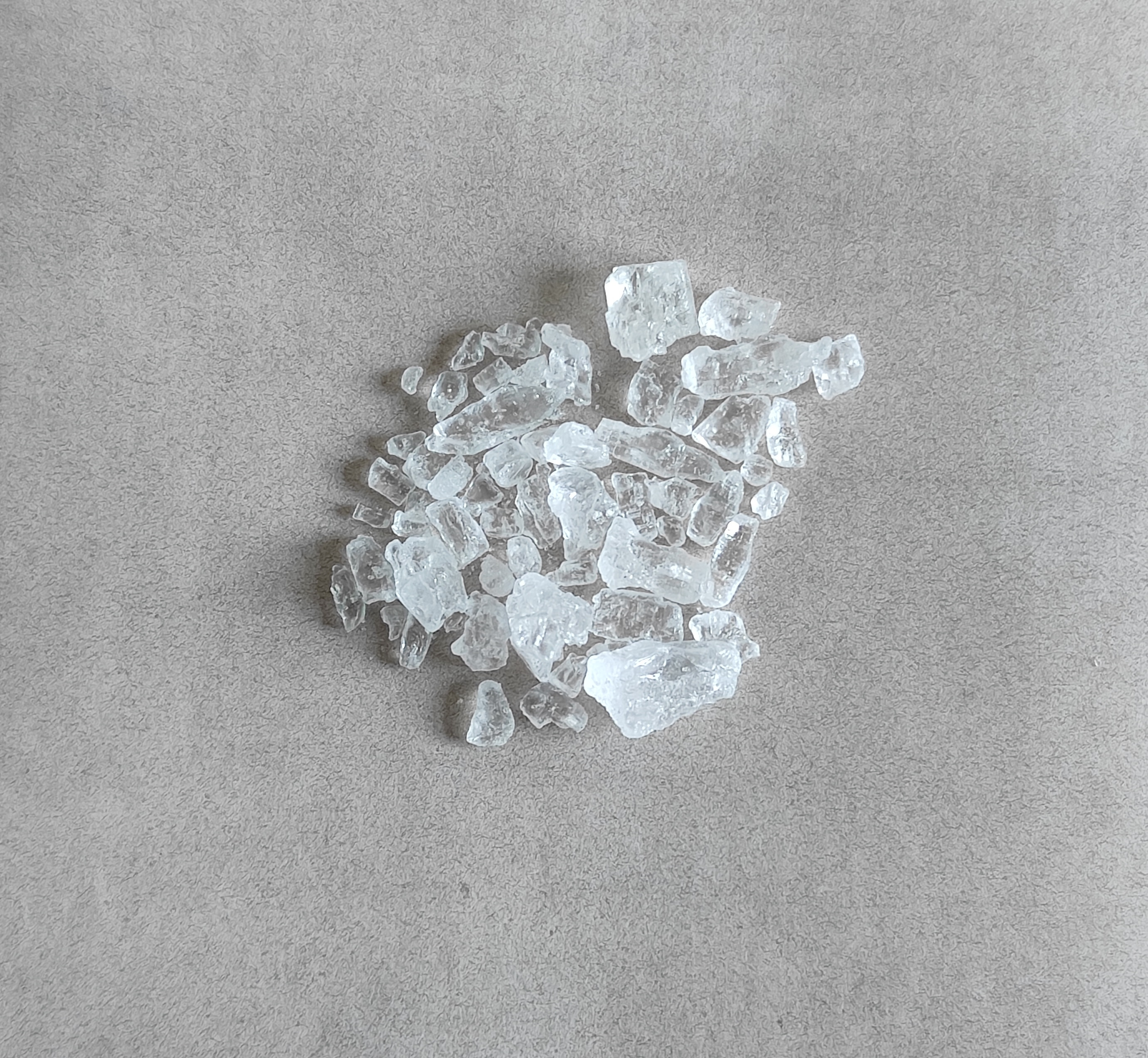

Names
- Preferred IUPAC name 1,3,5-Trichlorobenzene
- Other names sym-Trichlorobenzene

Identifiers
CAS Number	108-70-3
3D model (JSmol)	Interactive image
Beilstein Reference	1635233
ChEBI	CHEBI:49916
ChEMBL	ChEMBL44228
ChemSpider	7662
DrugBank	DB03836
ECHA InfoCard	100.003.281
EC Number	203-608-6
Gmelin Reference	601358
PubChem CID	7950
RTECS number	DC2100100
UNII	2HS4M0BX3C
CompTox Dashboard (EPA)	DTXSID8026195
- InChI: InChI=1S/C6H3Cl3/c7-4-1-5(8)3-6(9)2-4/h1-3H Key: XKEFYDZQGKAQCN-UHFFFAOYSA-N; InChI=1/C6H3Cl3/c7-4-1-5(8)3-6(9)2-4/h1-3H Key: XKEFYDZQGKAQCN-UHFFFAOYAQ
- SMILES: Clc1cc(Cl)cc(Cl)c1

Properties
Chemical formula	C_{6}H_{3}Cl_{3}
Molar mass	181.44 g·mol^{−1}
Appearance	White solid
Melting point	63 °C (145 °F; 336 K)
Boiling point	208.0 °C (406.4 °F; 481.1 K)
Solubility in water	0.6 mg/100 mL

Related compounds
Related compounds	1,2,3-Trichlorobenzene; 1,2,4-Trichlorobenzene; 1,3,5-Tribromobenzene

Hazards
- GHS labelling
Pictograms	(GHS07: Exclamation mark)
Signal word	Warning
Hazard statements	H302, H312, H315, H319, H332, H335, H412
Precautionary statements	P261, P264, P270, P271, P273, P280, P301+P312, P302+P352, P304+P312, P304+P340, P305+P351+P338, P312, P321, P322, P330, P332+P313, P337+P313, P362, P363, P403+P233, P405, P501
Flash point	107 °C (225 °F; 380 K)
- Lethal dose or concentration (LD, LC)
LD_{50} (median dose)	800 mg/kg (oral, rat); 3350 mg/kg (oral, mouse)
- Except where otherwise noted, data are given for materials in their standard state (at 25 °C [77 °F], 100 kPa). verify (what is ?) Infobox references

1,3,5-Trichlorobenzene is an organochlorine compound. It is one of the three isomers of trichlorobenzene. Being more symmetrical than the other isomers, it exists as colourless crystals whereas the other isomers are liquids at room temperature.

It is not formed upon chlorination of benzene. Instead it is prepared by the Sandmeyer reaction from 3,5-dichloroaniline.

== See also ==
- Chlorobenzenes—different numbers of chlorine substituents and isomeric forms
