= Rhadinomyia burmanica =

Scientific classification
- Kingdom: Animalia
- Phylum: Arthropoda
- Class: Insecta
- Order: Diptera
- Family: Ulidiidae
- Genus: Rhadinomyia
- Species: R. burmanica

Binomial name
- Rhadinomyia burmanica Frey, 1959

Species of fly

Rhadinomyia burmanica is a species of ulidiid or picture-winged fly in the genus Rhadinomyia of the family Ulidiidae.
