= Lumbriculus multiatriatus =

Scientific classification
- Kingdom: Animalia
- Phylum: Annelida
- Clade: Pleistoannelida
- Clade: Sedentaria
- Class: Clitellata
- Order: Lumbriculida
- Family: Lumbriculidae
- Genus: Lumbriculus
- Species: L. multiatriatus

Binomial name
- Lumbriculus multiatriatus Yamaguchi, 1937

Species of freshwater annelid worm

Lumbriculus multiatriatus was described by Yamaguchi in 1937 from several specimens from Sakhalin and Hokkaidō. As the name suggests, it is distinguished from other Lumbriculus species by having four atria, as opposed to the one or two that is standard from the genus.
