= 1,3,5-Tribromobenzene =

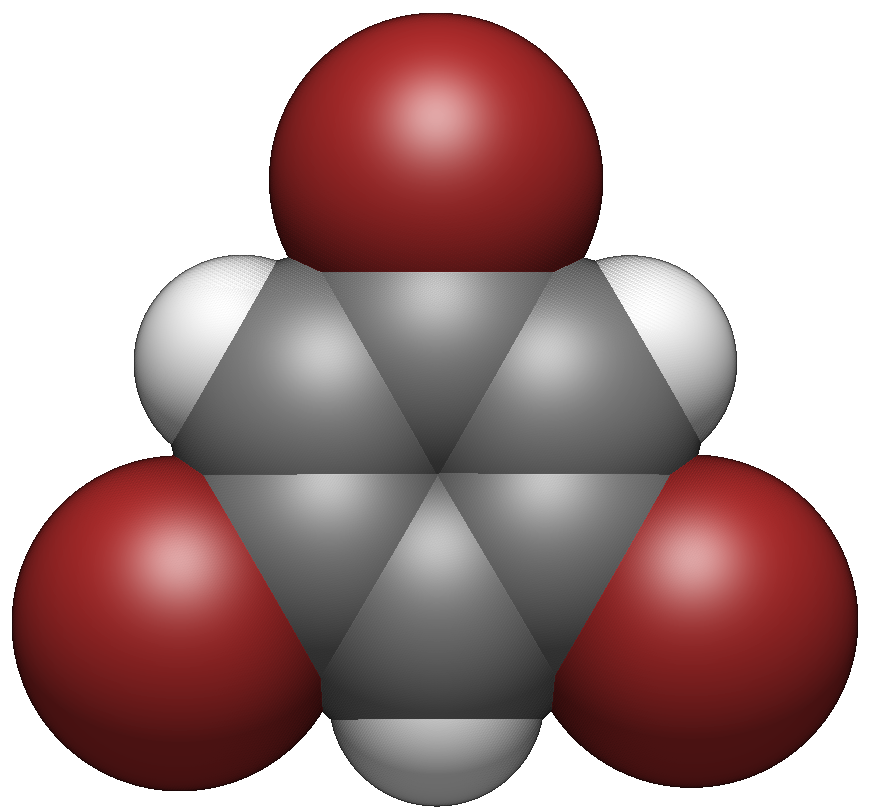

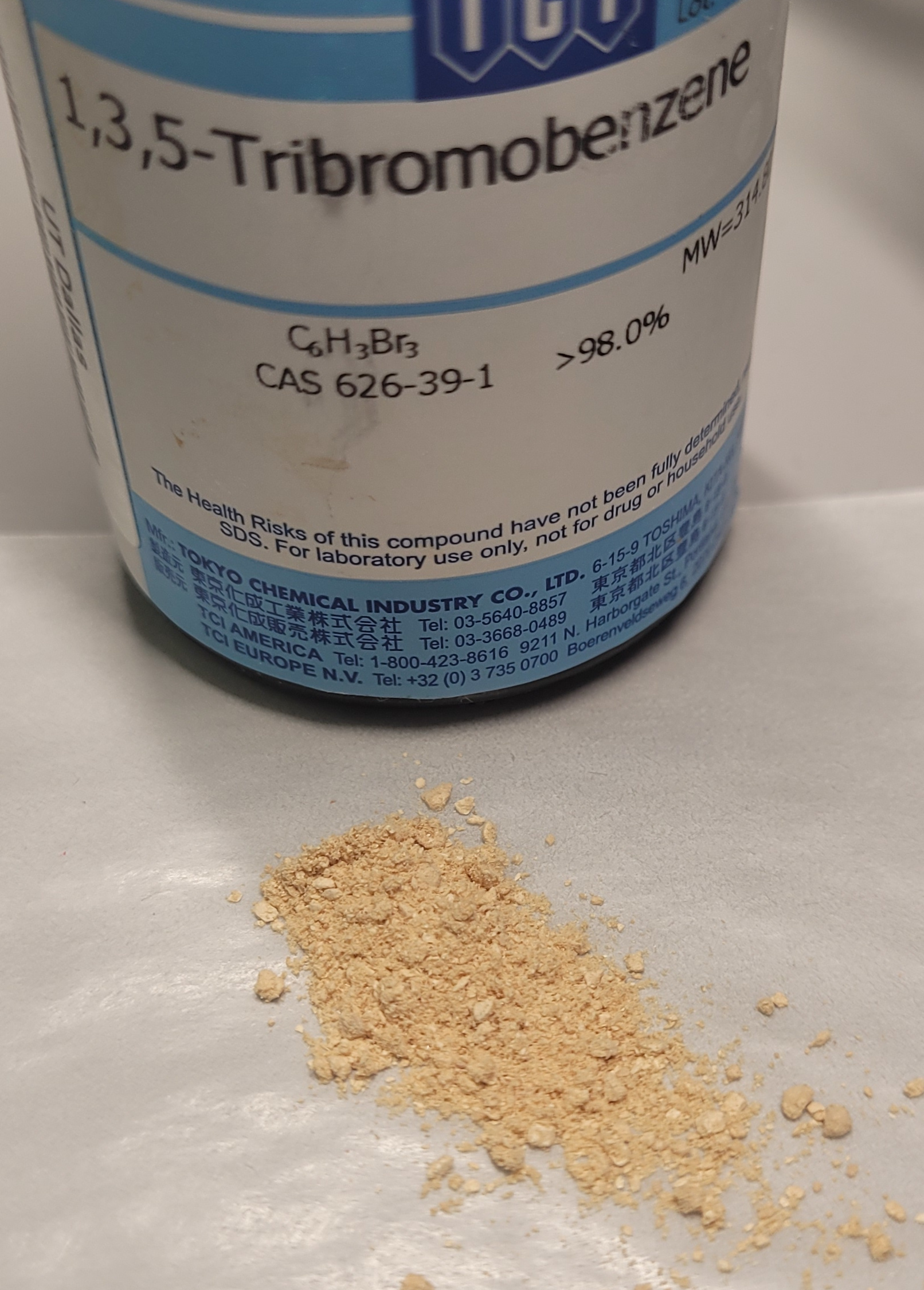

Names
- Preferred IUPAC name 1,3,5-Tribromobenzene
- Other names sym-Tribromobenzene

Identifiers
CAS Number	626-39-1
3D model (JSmol)	Interactive image
ChemSpider	11776
ECHA InfoCard	100.009.953
EC Number	210-947-3
PubChem CID	12279
UNII	O3TD0U1OAQ
CompTox Dashboard (EPA)	DTXSID3052307
- InChI: InChI=1S/C6H3Br3/c7-4-1-5(8)3-6(9)2-4/h1-3H Key: YWDUZLFWHVQCHY-UHFFFAOYSA-N
- SMILES: C1=C(C=C(C=C1Br)Br)Br

Properties
Chemical formula	C_{6}H_{3}Br_{3}
Molar mass	314.802 g·mol^{−1}
Appearance	colorless solid
Melting point	122 °C (252 °F; 395 K)
Boiling point	271 °C (520 °F; 544 K)
- Except where otherwise noted, data are given for materials in their standard state (at 25 °C [77 °F], 100 kPa). Infobox references

1,3,5-Tribromobenzene is an aryl bromide and isomer of tribromobenzene, also known as sym-tribromobenzene.

== Preparation ==
Brominating aniline with elemental bromine gives 2,4,6-tribromoaniline. This is then diazotized, then reacted with ethanol to replace the diazonium group with hydrogen, forming 1,3,5-tribromobenzene.

It has also been prepared by these methods:

- replacement of the amino group of 3,5-dibromoaniline with bromine
- the action of light on bromoacetylene, effecting an alkyne trimerisation to 1,3,5-tribromobenzene
- decomposition of 2,4,6-tribromophenylhydrazine
- reduction of 2,4,6-tribromobenzenediazonium sulfate
- a side product in the preparation of 2,4,6-tribromobenzonitrile

== Reactions and uses ==
1,3,5-tris(4-formylphenyl)benzene (TFPB)

1,3,5-Tribromobenzene is a precursor to C_{3}-symmetric molecules. It undergoes a Suzuki reaction with three equivalents of 4-formylphenylboronic acid to form 1,3,5-tris(4-formylphenyl)benzene (TFPB), a monomer for covalent organic frameworks.
