= Rhadinomyia =

Scientific classification
- Domain: Eukaryota
- Kingdom: Animalia
- Phylum: Arthropoda
- Class: Insecta
- Order: Diptera
- Family: Ulidiidae
- Genus: Rhadinomyia

Genus of flies

Rhadinomyia is a genus of picture-winged flies in the family Ulidiidae.

== Species ==
- R. burmanica
- R. conjuncta
- R. luzonica
- R. orientalis
