= Lumbriculus illex =

Scientific classification
- Kingdom: Animalia
- Phylum: Annelida
- Clade: Pleistoannelida
- Clade: Sedentaria
- Class: Clitellata
- Order: Lumbriculida
- Family: Lumbriculidae
- Genus: Lumbriculus
- Species: L. illex

Binomial name
- Lumbriculus illex Timm & Rodriguez, 1994

Species of freshwater annelid worm

Lumbriculus illex is a fresh-water worm, the most recently described member of the genus (Timm & Rodriguez, 1994), and is known only from 3 individuals found in Komarovka stream, north of Vladivostok. In most regards, this species is probably similar to Lumbriculus variegatus, but it can be told apart from this species by its one-pointed setae (other Lumbriculus have two-pointed setae). Its closest relative is probably L. sachalinus or L. olgae. Mature Lumbriculus can also easily be told apart by a number of genital characters, but as few of the species in the genus ever become sexually mature, this method of identification is often useless.
