= Rhadinomyia conjuncta =

Scientific classification
- Kingdom: Animalia
- Phylum: Arthropoda
- Clade: Pancrustacea
- Class: Insecta
- Order: Diptera
- Family: Ulidiidae
- Genus: Rhadinomyia
- Species: R. conjuncta

Binomial name
- Rhadinomyia conjuncta Meijere, 1914

Species of fly

Rhadinomyia conjuncta is a species of fly in the genus Rhadinomyia of the family Ulidiidae.
