= Silometopoides =

Scientific classification
- Kingdom: Animalia
- Phylum: Arthropoda
- Subphylum: Chelicerata
- Class: Arachnida
- Order: Araneae
- Infraorder: Araneomorphae
- Family: Linyphiidae
- Genus: Silometopoides; Eskov, 1990

Type species
- S. pampia (Chamberlin, 1949)

Species
- 9, see text

Synonyms
- Orientopus Eskov, 1992

Genus of spiders

Silometopoides is a genus of sheet weavers that was first described by K. Y. Eskov in 1990.

== Species ==
As of May 2019 it contains nine species, found in Europe, Asia, the United States, Canada, and Greenland:

- Silometopoides asiaticus (Eskov, 1995) – Kazakhstan;
- Silometopoides koponeni (Eskov & Marusik, 1994) – Russia;
- Silometopoides mongolensis Eskov & Marusik, 1992 – Russia, Mongolia;
- Silometopoides pampia (Chamberlin, 1949) (type) – Russia, Canada, Greenland;
- Silometopoides pingrensis (Crosby & Bishop, 1933) – USA;
- Silometopoides sibiricus (Eskov, 1989) – Russia;
- Silometopoides sphagnicola Eskov & Marusik, 1992 – Russia (Europe, Siberia);
- Silometopoides tibialis (Heimer, 1987) – Russia, Mongolia;
- Silometopoides yodoensis (Oi, 1960) – Russia, China, Korea, Japan.
