= 4-Formylphenylboronic acid =

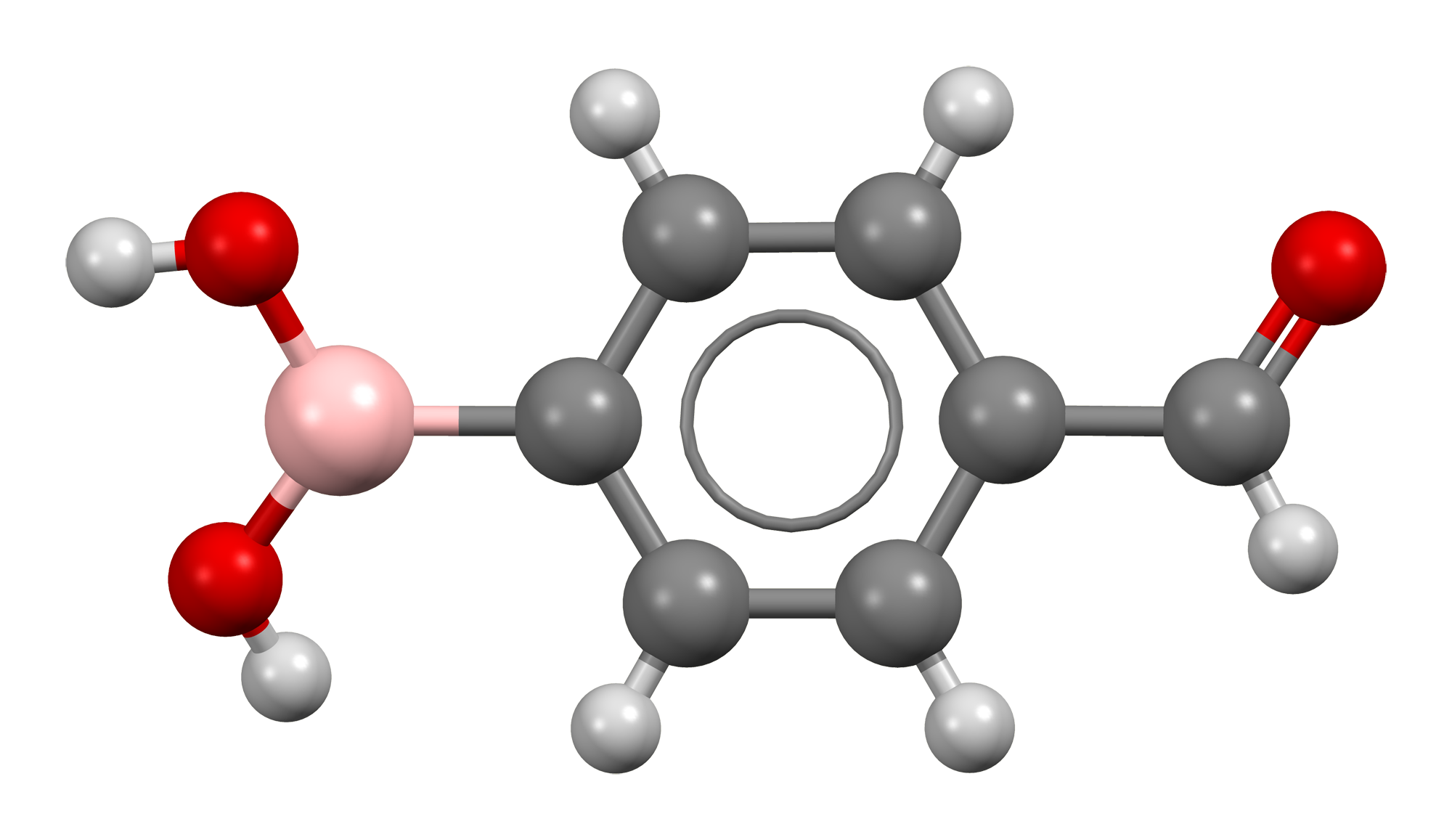

Names
- Preferred IUPAC name 4-(Dihydroxyboranyl)benzaldehyde

Identifiers
CAS Number	87199-17-5
3D model (JSmol)	Interactive image
ChEMBL	ChEMBL140254
ChemSpider	513834
ECHA InfoCard	100.103.550
EC Number	438-670-5
PubChem CID	591073
UNII	Z4V1TO2DWR
CompTox Dashboard (EPA)	DTXSID6074887
- InChI: InChI=1S/C7H7BO3/c9-5-6-1-3-7(4-2-6)8(10)11/h1-5,10-11H Key: VXWBQOJISHAKKM-UHFFFAOYSA-N
- SMILES: B(C1=CC=C(C=C1)C=O)(O)O

Properties
Chemical formula	C_{7}H_{7}BO_{3}
Molar mass	149.94 g·mol^{−1}
Appearance	white solid
- Except where otherwise noted, data are given for materials in their standard state (at 25 °C [77 °F], 100 kPa). Infobox references

4-Formylphenylboronic acid (4-FPBA) is an organoboron compound with the formula (HO)_{2}BC_{6}H_{4}CO_{2}H. As a bifunctional molecule, it is used as a building block in the synthesis of other organic compounds.

== Synthesis ==
The synthesis of 4-formylyphenylboronic acid was reported by the group of Heinrich Nöth in 1990. 4-Bromobenzaldehyde was used as starting material. The acetalization of the aldehyde group was carried out by standard methods using diethoxymethoxyethane and ethanol to give 1-bromo-4-(diethoxymethyl)benzene. The formation of the Grignard compound with magnesium requires 1,2-dibromoethane and activation with ultrasound. Reaction with tri-n-butyl borate leads to the protected aryl boronic ester which gives after acidic work-up the target product in 78% yield.

Synthese von 4-Formylphenylboronsäure nach Nöth

The same reactants are forming with the aryl boronic ester at −60 °C 4-formylyphenylboronic acid with a 99% yield when activated with sodium bis(2-methoxyethoxy)aluminiumhydride, also on the kilogram scale.

When the aryllithium compound of 1-bromo-4-(diethoxymethyl)benzene is used with triisopropylborate at −78 °C instead of the Grignard compound (via n-butyllithium) 4-formylphenylboronic acid is obtained in 99% crude yield.

4-Formylphenylboronsäure mit n-Butyllithium

Disadvantages of both routes are the high price of the educts used (such as 4-bromobenzaldehyde, boronic esters of higher alcohols and butyllithium) as well as in the Nöth route the difficult workup after the hydrolysis by n-butanol. More recently, an improved process has been patented using less expensive starting materials such as 4-chlorobenzaldehyde, metallic lithium and trimethyl borate.

Synthese von 4-Formylphenylboronsäure aus 4-Chlorbenzaldehy und Lithiummetall

4-Formylphenylboronic acid can also be prepared by hydrolysis of potassium 4-formylphenyl-trifluoroborate by means of acidic alumina or silicon dioxide. As a rule, phenylboronic acids serve as starting compounds for the corresponding potassium aryl trifluoroborates.

== Properties ==
4-Formylphenyl boronic acid crystallizes in colorless needles or is obtained as an odorless, whitish powder, which dissolves little in cold but better in hot water. The compound is quite stable and readily forms dimers and cyclic trimeric anhydrides, which complicate purification and tend to protodeboronize, a secondary reaction that occurs frequently in the Suzuki coupling, with elimination of the boronic acid function.

== Applications ==
4-Formylphenylboronic acid is used in Suzuki couplings, for example in the build up of biphenyl compounds such as a precursor of the antihypertensive AT1 antagonist telmisartan in an improved synthesis:

Synthese eines Telmisartan-Vorstufe durch Suzuki-Kupplung mit 4-FPBA

Also palladium-catalyzed aryl heteroaryl linkages after Suzuki use 4-formylphenylboronic acid as a molecular building block, as for instance in the synthesis of aryl-benzimidazole derivatives (which bind to peroxisome-proliferator-activated receptors (PPARγ) and activate the expression of a variety of genes):

Aryl-Heteroarylkupplung

In a copper-mediated fluoroalkylation reaction, the boronic acid group of the 4-FPBA can be replaced with perfluorinated alkyl iodides (R_{f}-I) by a perfluoroalkyl chain under mild conditions.

Umsetzung von 4-FPBA mit Perfluoralkyliodiden

4-Formyphenylboronic acid is used industrially as an enzyme stabilizer for proteases and in particular for lipases in liquid detergent preparations. The addition of 4-FPBA in amounts < 0.08 wt% in the formulation reduces the loss of hydrolytic activity of the enzymes used and increases the storage stability of enzyme-containing liquid detergents.

The substance is an inhibitor for some enzymes and as a bactericide.
