= Rhynchelmis =

Scientific classification
- Kingdom: Animalia
- Phylum: Annelida
- Clade: Pleistoannelida
- Clade: Sedentaria
- Class: Clitellata
- Order: Lumbriculida
- Family: Lumbriculidae
- Genus: Rhynchelmis; Hoffmeister, 1843

Genus of freshwater annelid worm

Rhynchelmis is the genus of 26 species of aquatic oligochaetes from the Northern Hemisphere, with 14 species from North America and 12 from Eurasia. They are part of the family Lumbriculidae, which are among the largest of the microdriles. They are generally defined as having atria in segment X and spermathecae in segment VIII. The prostomium generally has a proboscis, from which the genus has got its name.

== Species ==
There are 26 currently accepted species:

- Rhynchelmis (Rhynchelmoides) alaskana Holmquist, 1976
- Rhynchelmis aleutensis Fend, 2005
- Rhynchelmis alius Kaygorodova, 2006
- Rhynchelmis bolinensis Fend et Lenat, 2010
- Rhynchelmis brachycephala Michaelsen, 1901
- Rhynchelmis brooksi Holmquist, 1976
- Rhynchelmis croatanensis Fend et Lenat, 2010
- Rhynchelmis (Sutroa) diespluviae Fend, 2014
- Rhynchelmis elrodi Smith et Dickey, 1918
- Rhynchelmis gilensis Fend et Brinkhurst, 2000
- Rhynchelmis granuensis Hrabě, 1961
- Rhynchelmis gustafsoni Fend et Brinkhurst, 2000
- Rhynchelmis (Sutroa) klamathensis Fend, 2014
- Rhynchelmis komareki Hrabě, 1927
- Rhynchelmis limosella Hoffmeister, 1843
- Rhynchelmis maleviči Sokolskaya, 1983
- Rhynchelmis monsserratus Fend et Brinkhurst, 2000
- Rhynchelmis obtusirostris (Menge, 1845)
- Rhynchelmis obtusirostris (Menge, 1845)
- Rhynchelmis (Rhynchelmoides) orientalis Yamaguchi, 1936
- Rhynchelmis (Sutroa) rostrata Eisen, 1888
- Rhynchelmis (Rhynchelmoides) saxosa Fend et Brinkhurst, 2000
- Rhynchelmis tetratheca Michaelsen, 1920
- Rhynchelmis (Sutroa) utahensis Fend et Brinkhurst, 2000
- Rhynchelmis vagensis Hrabě, 1954
- Rhynchelmis vejdovskyi Hrabě et Černosvitov, 1925
