= C3H6O =

The molecular formula C_{3}H_{6}O may refer to:

- Alcohols
  - Allyl alcohol or 2-propen-1-ol, CH_{2}=CH-CH_{2}OH, CAS number 107-18-6
  - cyclopropanol or cyclopropyl alcohol, cyclo (-CH_{2}-CH_{2}-HOHC-), CAS number 16545-68-9
- Aldehydes
  - propanal or propionaldehyde, CH_{3}CH_{2}-CHO, CAS number 123-38-6
- Ketones
  - Propanone or acetone, CH_{3}-CO-CH_{3}, CAS number 67-64-1
- Enols (tautomers of aldehydes and ketones)
  - (E)-1-propen-1-ol, CH_{3}-CH=CH-OH, CAS number 57642-95-2
  - (Z)-1-propen-1-ol, CH_{3}-CH=CH-OH, CAS number 57642-96-3
  - propen-2-ol, CH_{2}=C(OH)-CH_{3}, CAS number 29456-04-0 or 74324-85-9
- Ethers
  - methyl vinyl ether or methoxyethene, H_{3}C-O-CH=CH_{2}, CAS number: 107-25-5
  - oxetane or trimethylene oxide, cyclo(-CH_{2}-CH_{2}-O-CH_{2}-), CAS number: 503-30-0
  - 1,2-epoxy-propane or Propylene oxide or methyl oxirane, cyclo(-C*H(CH_{3})-CH_{2}-O-), C* chiral, CAS number: 75-56-9
    - (R)-(+)-methyl oxirane, CAS number 15448-47-2
    - (S)-(–)-methyl oxirane, CAS number 16088-62-3
