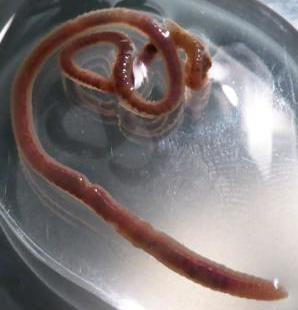

Scientific classification
- Kingdom: Animalia
- Phylum: Annelida
- Clade: Pleistoannelida
- Clade: Sedentaria
- Class: Clitellata
- Order: Lumbriculida
- Family: Lumbriculidae; Vejdovský, 1884

Genera
- See text

= Lumbriculidae =

Family of freshwater annelid worms

The Lumbriculidae are a family of microdrile oligochaetes common in freshwater environments, including streams, lakes, marshes, wells and groundwater. They should not be confused with the earthworm family Lumbricidae. Many species and genera are highly endemic, mainly in Siberia and the western parts of North America. Lumbriculidae are the only family in the order Lumbriculida.

The family contains:

- Bichaeta

Bichaeta sanguinea

- Cookidrilus

Cookidrilus speluncaeus

- Eclipidrilus

Subgenus Eclipidrilus

Eclipidrilus frigidus
Eclipidrilus asymmetricus
Eclipidrilus ithys

Subgenus Leptodrilus

Eclipidrilus fontanus
Eclipidrilus lacustris

Subgenus Premnodrilus

Eclipidrilus daneus
Eclipidrilus palustris

Incertae sedis

Eclipidrils pacificus

- Eremidrilus

Eremidrilus allegheniensis
Eremidrilus coyote
Eremidrilus elegans
Eremidrilus felini
Eremidrilus ritocsi

- Eumuliercula

Eumuliercula casta
Eumuliercula emendata

- Guestphalinus

Guestphalinus wiardi

- Hrabea

Hrabea ogumai

- Kincaidiana

Kincaidiana hexatheca
Kincaidiana freidris

- Lamprodrilus

Lamprodrilus achaetus
Lamprodrilus ammophagus
Lamprodrilus bulbosus
Lamprodrilus wagneri
Lamprodrilus mrazeki
Lamprodrilus nigrescens
Lamprodrilus pygmaeus
Lamprodrilus isoporus
Lamprodrilus michaelseni
Lamprodrilus bythius
Lamprodrilus satyriscus
Lamprodrilus melanotus
Lamprodrilus pallidus
Lamprodrilus dybowskyi
Lamprodrilus inflatus
Lamprodrilus issossimovi
Lamprodrilus jamburaensis
Lamprodrilus novikovae
Lamprodrilus polytoreutus
Lamprodrilus secernus
Lamprodrilus semenkewitschi
Lamprodrilus stigmatias
Lamprodrilus tolli

- Agriodrilus

Agriodrilus vermivorus

- Teleuscolex

Teleuscolex baicalensis
Teleuscolex grubei
Teleuscolex korotneffi
Teleuscolex glaber

- Lamprortus

Lamprortus orientalis

- Lumbriculus

Lumbriculus variegatus
Lumbriculus ambiguus
Lumbriculus multiatriatus
Lumbriculus genitosetosus
Lumbriculus inconstans
Lumbriculus sachalinicus
Lumbriculus olgae
Lumbriculus alexandrovi
Lumbriculus kareliensis
Lumbriculus illex
Lumbriculus kolymensis
Lumbriculus tetraporophorus
Lumbriculus japonicus
Lumbriculus mukoensis

- Phagodrilus

Phagodrilus laqueus
Phagodrilus balchi
Phagodrilus baueri
Phagodrilus chetcoensis
Phagodrilus hauserensis
Phagodrilus johnsoni
Phagodrilus klamathensis
Phagodrilus macnabi
Phagodrilus minimus
Phagodrilus oregonensis
Phagodrilus parvus
Phagodrilus pereditus
Phagodrilus phoebe
Phagodrilus secundus
Phagodrilus stellatus

- Rhynchelmis

Subgenus Rhynchelmis

Rhynchelmis brachycephala
Rhynchelmis granuensis
Rhynchelmis komareki
Rhynchelmis limosella
Rhynchelmis tetratheca
Rhynchelmis vagensis
Rhynchelmis vejdovskyi

Subgenus Rhynchelmoides

Rhynchelmis alaskana
Rhynchelmis elrodi
Rhynchelmis glandula
Rhynchelmis saxosa

Subgenus Sutroa

Rhynchelmis gilensis
Rhynchelmis gustafsoni
Rhynchelmis monsserratus
Rhynchelmis rostrata
Rhynchelmis utahensis
Rhynclemis yakimorum

Incertae sedis

Rhynchelmis aleutensis
Rhynchelmis brooksi
Rhynchelmis malevici
Rhynchelmis orientalis

- Pseudorhynchelmis

Pseudorhynchelmis alyonae
Pseudorhynchelmis anomala
Pseudorhynchelmis dissimilis
Pseudorhynchelmis minimaris
Pseudorhynchelmis olchoensis
Pseudorhynchelmis paraolchonensis
Pseudorhynchelmis parva
Pseudorhynchelmis semernoyi
Pseudorhynchelmis shamanensis
Pseudorhynchelmis spermatochaeta

- Secubelmis

Secubelmis limpida

- Spelaedrilus

Spelaedrilus multiporus

- Stylodrilus

Subgenus Stylodrilus

Stylodrilus absoloni
Stylodrilus asiaticus
Stylodrilus aurantiacus
Stylodrilus brachystylus
Stylodrilus californianus
Stylodrilus cernosvitovi
Stylodrilus chukotensis
Stylodrilus contractus
Stylodrilus crassus
Stylodrilus curvithecus
Stylodrilus elongatus
Stylodrilus glandulosus
Stylodrilus gracilis
Stylodrilus heringianus
Stylodrilus insperatus
Stylodrilus lankesteri
Stylodrilus lemani
Stylodrilus leucocephalus
Stylodrilus longiatriatus
Stylodrilus minutus
Stylodrilus mirandus
Stylodrilus mirus
Stylodrilus mollis
Stylodrilus opisthoannulatus
Stylodrilus parvus
Stylodrilus subcarpathicus
Stylodrilus subitus
Stylodrilus sulcatus
Stylodrilus sulci
Stylodrilus suputensis
Stylodrilus wahkeenensis

Subgenus Bythonomus

Stylodrilus beattiei
Stylodrilus sovaliki
Stylodrilus tschaunensis

- Styloscolex

Subgenus Styloscolex

Styloscolex asymmetricus
Styloscolex baikalensis
Styloscolex burowi
Styloscolex chorioidalis
Styloscolex japonicus
Styloscolex kolmakowi
Styloscolex opisthothecus
Styloscolex solzanicus
Styloscolex swarczewski
Styloscolex tetrathecus
Styloscolex tubulatus

Subgenus Neoscolex

Styloscolex levanidovi
Styloscolex macer
Styloscolex sokolskajae

- Tatriella

Tatriella slovenica
Tatriella longiatriata

- Tenagodrilus

Tenagodrilus musculus

- Trichodrilus

Trichodrilus allobrogum
Trichodrilus anglieri
Trichodrilus aporophorus
Trichodrilus bonheurensis
Trichodrilus cantabrigiensis
Trichodrilus capilliformis
Trichodrilus cernosvitovi
Trichodrilus claparedei
Trichodrilus culveri
Trichodrilus diversisetosus
Trichodrilus gordeevi
Trichodrilus hrabei
Trichodrilus icenorum
Trichodrilus intermedius
Trichodrilus itchaensis
Trichodrilus leruthi
Trichodrilus longipenis
Trichodrilus macroporophorus
Trichodrilus medius
Trichodrilus montenegrensis
Trichodrilus moravicus
Trichodrilus pauper
Trichodrilus pragensis
Trichodrilus ptujensis
Trichodrilus rouchi
Trichodrilus seirei
Trichodrilus sketi
Trichodrilus stammeri
Trichodrilus strandi
Trichodrilus tacensis
Trichodrilus tatrensis
Trichodrilus tenuis

- Wsewolodus

Wsewolodus mixtus

- Yamaguchia

Yamaguchia toyensis
