= 1,2,3-Trichlorobenzene =

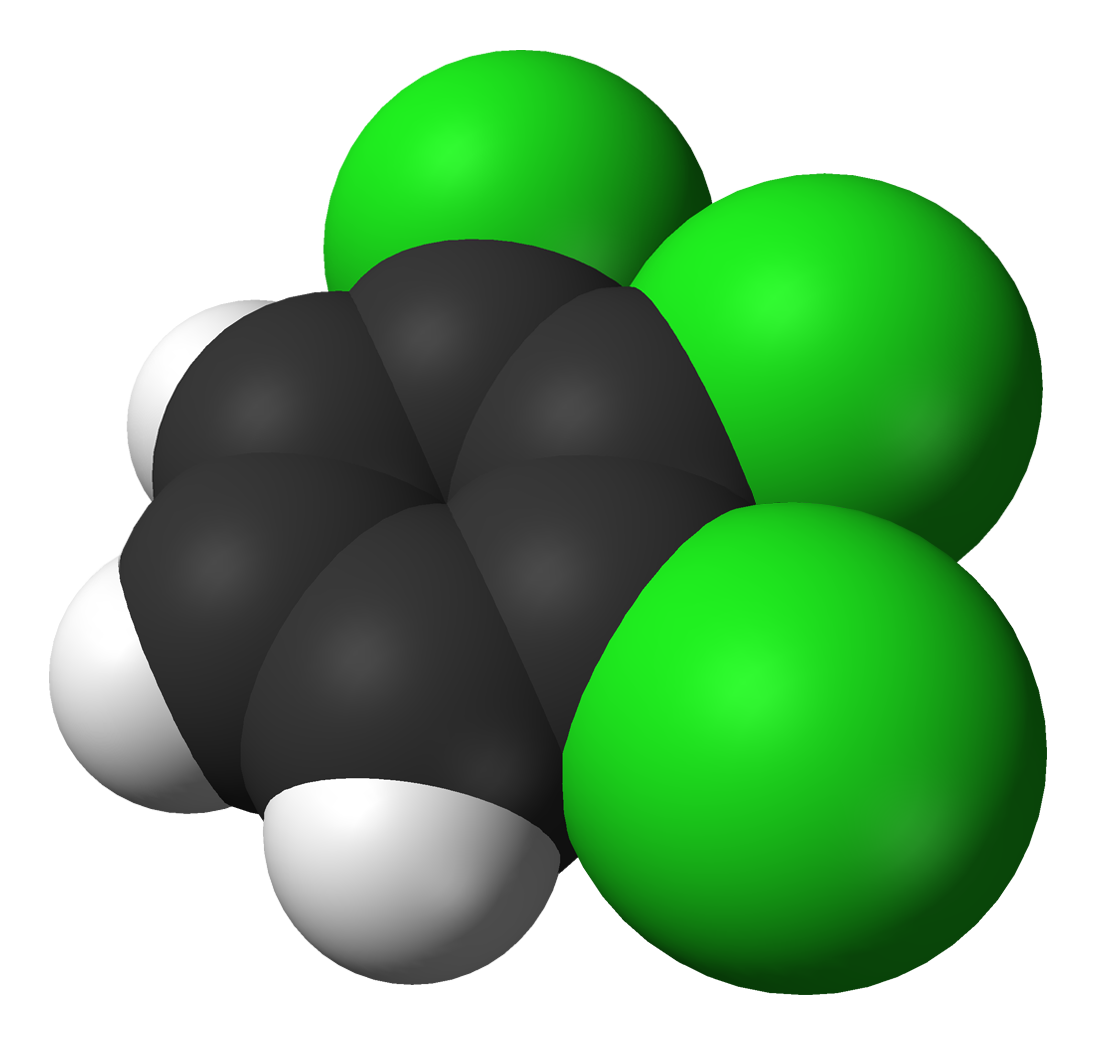

Names
- Preferred IUPAC name 1,2,3-Trichlorobenzene
- Other names 1,2,3-TCB

Identifiers
CAS Number	87-61-6
3D model (JSmol)	Interactive image
Beilstein Reference	956882
ChEBI	CHEBI:35289
ChEMBL	ChEMBL46557
ChemSpider	13864445
ECHA InfoCard	100.001.598
EC Number	201-757-1
Gmelin Reference	847785
KEGG	C14408
PubChem CID	6895
RTECS number	DC2095000
UNII	NUR9777IK4
CompTox Dashboard (EPA)	DTXSID8026193
- InChI: InChI=1S/C6H3Cl3/c7-4-2-1-3-5(8)6(4)9/h1-3H Key: RELMFMZEBKVZJC-UHFFFAOYSA-N
- SMILES: C1=CC(=C(C(=C1)Cl)Cl)Cl

Properties
Chemical formula	C_{6}H_{3}Cl_{3}
Molar mass	181.44 g·mol^{−1}
Appearance	white crystals
Density	1.45 g/cm^{3}
Melting point	53.5 °C (128.3 °F; 326.6 K)
Boiling point	218.5 °C (425.3 °F; 491.6 K)
Solubility in water	Soluble

Hazards
- GHS labelling
Pictograms	(GHS07: Exclamation mark) (GHS09: Environmental hazard)
Signal word	Warning
Hazard statements	H302, H410
Precautionary statements	P273, P301, P312, P330
Flash point	112.7 °C (234.9 °F; 385.8 K)

Related compounds
Related compounds	1,2,4-Trichlorobenzene; 1,3,5-Trichlorobenzene
- Except where otherwise noted, data are given for materials in their standard state (at 25 °C [77 °F], 100 kPa). Infobox references

1,2,3-Trichlorobenzene is an organochlorine compound with the chemical formula C_{6}H_{3}Cl_{3}. This is one of three isomers of trichlorobenzene; the two others are 1,2,4-Trichlorobenzene and 1,3,5-Trichlorobenzene.

== Synthesis ==
1,2,3-Trichlorobenzene can be prepared via dehydrohalogenation of hexachlorocyclohexane. Also, 1,3,5-trichlorobenzene is formed as a byproduct. Small amounts of 1,2,3-trichlorobenzene can also be produced while chlorinating benzene with iron(III) chloride as a catalyst.

== Physical properties ==
The compound forms white crystals with a faint aromatic odor. It is combustible and poorly soluble in water. The substance is irritating to eyes and the respiratory tract.

== Uses ==
1,2,3-Trichlorobenzene is used as a herbicide. Also as a solvent for high-melting products, as a coolant in electrical installations and glass tempering.

== See also ==
- Chlorobenzenes—different numbers of chlorine substituents and isomeric forms.
