= 1,2,4-Trichlorobenzene =

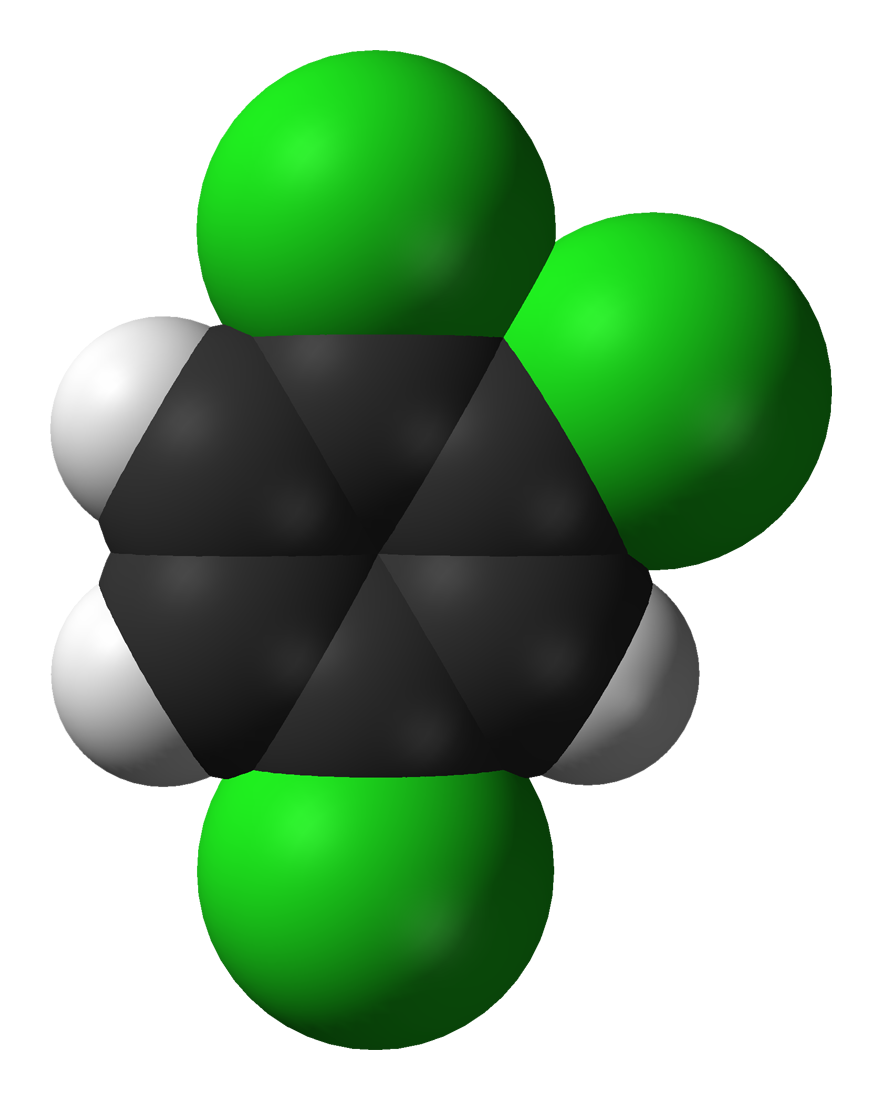

Names
- Preferred IUPAC name 1,2,4-Trichlorobenzene

Identifiers
CAS Number	120-82-1
3D model (JSmol)	Interactive image
ChEBI	CHEBI:28222
ChemSpider	13862559
ECHA InfoCard	100.004.026
PubChem CID	13
UNII	05IQ959M1N
CompTox Dashboard (EPA)	DTXSID0021965
- InChI: InChI=1/C6H3Cl3/c7-4-1-2-5(8)6(9)3-4/h1-3H<
- SMILES: Clc1ccc(Cl)c(Cl)c1

Properties
Chemical formula	C_{6}H_{3}Cl_{3}
Molar mass	181.44 g·mol^{−1}
Appearance	Colorless liquid
Odor	aromatic
Density	1.46 g cm^{−3}
Melting point	16.9 °C (62.4 °F; 290.0 K)
Boiling point	213.5 °C (416.3 °F; 486.6 K)
Solubility in water	0.003% (20 °C)
Vapor pressure	1 mmHg (20 °C)

Related compounds
Related compounds	1,2,3-Trichlorobenzene; 1,3,5-Trichlorobenzene

Hazards
Flash point	110 °C (230 °F; 383 K)
Explosive limits	2.5%–6.6% (150°C)
- NIOSH (US health exposure limits)
PEL (Permissible)	none
REL (Recommended)	C 5 ppm (40 mg/m^{3})
IDLH (Immediate danger)	N.D.
- Except where otherwise noted, data are given for materials in their standard state (at 25 °C [77 °F], 100 kPa). verify (what is ?) Infobox references

1,2,4-Trichlorobenzene is an organochlorine compound, one of three isomers of trichlorobenzene. It is a derivative of benzene with three chloride substituents. It is a colorless liquid used as a solvent for a variety of compounds and materials.

== Production and uses ==
Depending on the conditions and additives (e.g., sulfur), it can be the main product from the chlorination of benzene. It is virtually the exclusive product from the chlorination of 1,4-dichlorobenzene. It is also the main product from the dehydrochlorination of hexachlorocyclohexane.

It is useful as a high-temperature solvent, e.g. for gel permeation chromatography of polyolefins such as polyethylene or polypropylene.

Aside from its use as a solvent, this compound is a useful precursor to dye and pesticides.

== Safety ==
The LD50 (oral, rats) is 756 mg/kg. Animal studies have shown that 1,2,4-trichlorobenzene affects the liver and kidney, and is possibly a teratogen. There is no regulated occupational exposure limit for chemical exposure, but the National Institute for Occupational Safety and Health recommends no greater exposure than 5 ppm, over an 8-hour workday.

== See also ==
- Chlorobenzenes—different numbers of chlorine substituents and isomeric forms
