= Plastochron =

As the tip of a plant shoot grows, new leaves are produced at regular time intervals if the temperature is held constant. This time interval is termed the plastochron (or plastochrone). The plastochrone index and the leaf plastochron index are ways of measuring the age of a plant depending on morphological traits rather than on chronological age. Use of these indices removes differences caused by germination, developmental differences and exponential growth.

== Definitions ==
The spatial pattern of the arrangement of leaves is called phyllotaxy whereas the time between successive leaf initiation events is called the plastochron and the rate of emergence from the apical bud is the phyllochron.

== Plastochron ratio ==
In 1951, F. J. Richards introduced the idea of the plastochron ratio and developed a system of equations to describe mathematically a centric representation using three parameters: plastochron ratio, divergence angle, and the angle of the cone tangential to the apex in the area being considered.

Emerging phyllodes or leaf variants experience a sudden change from a high humidity environment to a more arid one. There are other changes they encounter such as variations in light level, photoperiod and the gaseous content of the air.
