= Trichlorobenzene =

Trichlorobenzene (TCB) may refer to any of three isomeric chlorinated derivatives of benzene with the molecular formula C_{6}H_{3}Cl_{3}. They differ by the positions of the chlorine atoms around the ring:

- 1,2,3-Trichlorobenzene
- 1,2,4-Trichlorobenzene
- 1,3,5-Trichlorobenzene
