= Stylodrilus =

Scientific classification
- Kingdom: Animalia
- Phylum: Annelida
- Clade: Pleistoannelida
- Clade: Sedentaria
- Class: Clitellata
- Order: Lumbriculida
- Family: Lumbriculidae
- Genus: Stylodrilus; Claperede, 1862

Genus of freshwater annelid worms

Stylodrilus is a genus of annelids belonging to the family Lumbruculidae.

The genus has cosmopolitan distribution.

== Species ==
There are 42 currently accepted species:

- Stylodrilus absoloni (Hrabĕ, 1970)
- Stylodrilus aclotudi Kaygorodova et Martin, 2008
- Stylodrilus asiaticus (Michaelsen, 1901)
- Stylodrilus aurantiacus (Pierantoni, 1904)
- Stylodrilus beattiei Cook, 1975
- Stylodrilus brachystylus Hrabĕ, 1929
- Stylodrilus californianus Rodriguez, 1996
- Stylodrilus černosvitovi Hrabĕ, 1950
- Stylodrilus čerepanovi Semernoy, 1982
- Stylodrilus chukotensis Sokolskaya, 1975
- Stylodrilus contractus Semernoy, 2004
- Stylodrilus coreyi Rodriguez, Fend et Lenat, 2014
- Stylodrilus crassus (Isossimov, 1962)
- Stylodrilus curvithecus Collado, Martínez-Ansemil et Giani, 1993
- Stylodrilus elongatus Semernoy, 2004
- Stylodrilus glandulosus Giani et Martínez-Ansemil, 1984
- Stylodrilus gracilis Semernoy, 2004
- Stylodrilus graingei Brinkhurst, 1964
- Stylodrilus heringianus Claparède, 1862
- Stylodrilus insperatus Semernoy, 2004
- Stylodrilus lankesteri (Vejdovsky, 1877)
- Stylodrilus lemani (Grube, 1879)
- Stylodrilus leucocephalus Hrabĕ, 1931
- Stylodrilus longiatriatus Dembitsky, 1976
- Stylodrilus mariae Achurra, Rodriguez et Erséus, 2015
- Stylodrilus minutus Hrabĕ, 1970
- Stylodrilus mirandus Hrabĕ, 1982
- Stylodrilus mirus (Čekanovskaja, 1956)
- Stylodrilus mollis Timm, 1998
- Stylodrilus opistoannulatus (Isossimov, 1962)
- Stylodrilus parvus (Hrabĕ et Černosvitov, 1927)
- Stylodrilus rarus Kaygorodova, 2006
- Stylodrilus sanguineus (Bretscher, 1900)
- Stylodrilus sovaliki (Holmquist, 1976)
- Stylodrilus subcarpathicus (Hrabĕ, 1929)
- Stylodrilus subitus Semernoy, 2004
- Stylodrilus sulcatus Semernoy, 2004
- Stylodrilus sulci (Hrabĕ, 1932)
- Stylodrilus suputensis Timm, 1995
- Stylodrilus swarczewskii Burow, 1931
- Stylodrilus tofaceus Rodriguez, Vučković et Kerovec, 2020
- Stylodrilus tschaunensis Morev, 1982
- Stylodrilus wahkeenensis Rodriguez et Coates, 1996
