= Methylammonium formate =

Identifiers
| CAS Number | 25596-28-5 |
| 3D model (JSmol) | Interactive image |
| EC Number | 827-119-8 |
| PubChem CID | 21903122 |
- InChI: InChI=1S/CH5N.CH2O2/c1-2;2-1-3/h2H2,1H3;1H,(H,2,3) Key: BAONHUZQTANSBI-UHFFFAOYSA-N
- SMILES: C[NH3+].C(=O)[O-]

Properties
| Chemical formula | C_{2}H_{7}NO_{2} |
| Molar mass | 77.083 g·mol^{−1} |
| Density | 1.05 |
| Melting point | 13 °C (55 °F; 286 K) |
| Boiling point | 162.1 °C (323.8 °F; 435.2 K) |
- Except where otherwise noted, data are given for materials in their standard state (at 25 °C [77 °F], 100 kPa). Infobox references

Methylammonium formate is an ionic liquid consisting of methylammonium (CH_{3}NH_{3}^{+}) as the cation and formate (HCOO^{–}) as the anion. This salt can be formed by the reaction between methylamine (CH_{3}NH_{2}) and formic acid (HCOOH). It has characteristics of both an ammonium salt and a formate salt. It is soluble in water, as well as other polar solvents.
