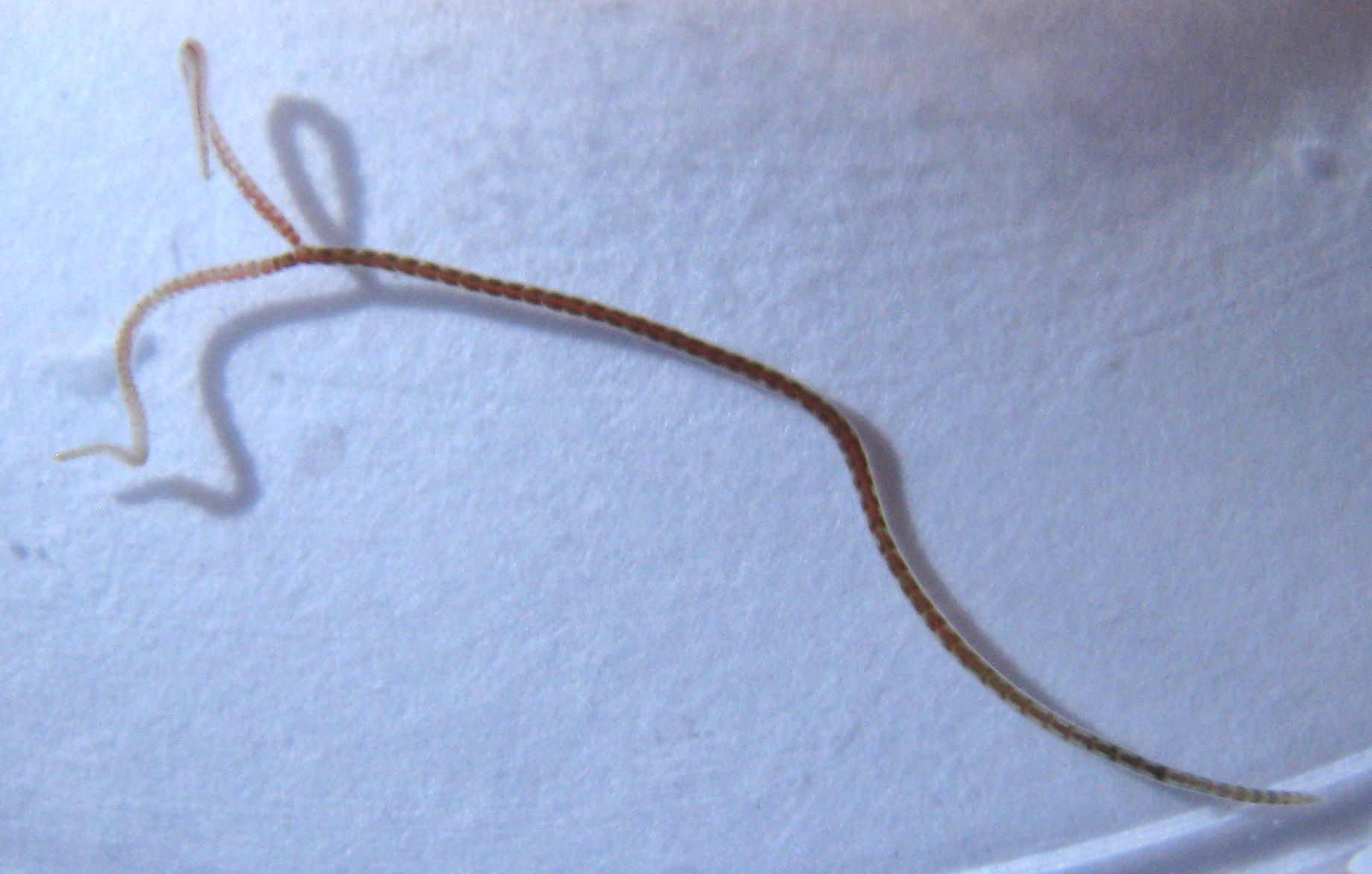
- Two-tailed specimen of Lumbriculus variegatus; the second tail might have been grown due to the injury to the first

Scientific classification
- Kingdom: Animalia
- Phylum: Annelida
- Clade: Pleistoannelida
- Clade: Sedentaria
- Class: Clitellata
- Order: Lumbriculida
- Family: Lumbriculidae
- Genus: Lumbriculus
- Species: L. variegatus

Binomial name
- Lumbriculus variegatus (Muller, 1774)

Synonyms
- Lumbriculus kareliensis Popčhenko, 1976

= Lumbriculus variegatus =

Species of freshwater annelid worm

Lumbriculus variegatus, also known as the blackworm or California blackworm or Australian Blackworm, is a species of worm inhabiting North America, Europe, and Australia. It lives in shallow-water marshes, ponds, and swamps, feeding on microorganisms and organic material. The maximum length of a specimen is 10 cm (3.9 in). Worms raised in laboratory environment are slightly shorter, with 4 to 6 cm (1.6 to 2.4 in) long bodies. An adult individual has approximately 150 to 250 1.5 mm wide segments, each of which has the ability to regenerate into a new individual when separated from the rest of the animal. In most populations, this is the primary mode of reproduction, and mature individuals are exceedingly rare; in large areas (including Asia, most of North America and the greater part of Europe) mature individuals have never been found. The name blackworm is given to at least three distinct species of worm that are identical in appearance and were once considered a single species.

== Characteristics ==
Among the characteristics of the genus is a green pigmentation of the anterior end, its two-pointed setae, and its curious reflex escape mechanisms. When touched, L. variegatus will attempt to escape, either by swimming in a helical ("cork-screw") fashion, or by reversing its body. The escape pattern used depends on where the worm is touched: anterior touch elicits body reversal, whereas posterior touch triggers helical swimming. L. variegatus has quick reflexes, and uses its photo-receptors to detect shadows and movement, both used to escape threats. The posterior end lifts out of the water and forms a right angle. It is then exposed to air and is used to exchange oxygen and carbon dioxide, although this exposes its posterior to its enemies. If the photo-receptors detect a shadow or movement, the posterior rapidly shortens in response to a threat.

L.variegatus can form tangled balls of more than a thousand individuals over several minutes to conserve heat and moisture in cool/dry conditions, to prevent desiccation. This tangle can move as a single unit and shape-shift. However, on sensing danger (e.g., a predator) the tangle can disentangle within milliseconds into single individuals; a mathematical model has been devised to explain this behavior.

== Reproduction ==
Regeneration in L. variegatus follows a set pattern which was studied by the Russian embryologist Piotr Ivanov. If the regenerating segment originated less than eight segments from the anterior tip, this number of segments are regenerated; if, however, the segment was originally from a more posterior position, only eight segments are regenerated. Posterior to the segment, a variable number of segments are regenerated, and the original segment undergoes transformation to become suited to the new, often more anterior position. L. variegatus is presumed to be holarctic in distribution, although in East Asia and North America (and perhaps other places as well), it is probably replaced by the other species of the genus (many of which are known from very small areas; L. illex, for instance, is known only from three individuals found in a stream north of Vladivostok). Mature L. variegatus specimens can easily be identified by a number of genital characters, but as few of the species in the genus ever become sexually mature, it is often difficult to do so. A physical description of L. variegatus is, to a large extent, valid for the entire genus.
