= C6H5Cl2N =

The molecular formula C_{6}H_{5}Cl_{2}N may refer to:

- Dichloroanilines
  - 2,3-Dichloroaniline
  - 2,4-Dichloroaniline
  - 2,5-Dichloroaniline
  - 2,6-Dichloroaniline
  - 3,4-Dichloroaniline
  - 3,5-Dichloroaniline
