= Monsanto legal cases =

Lawsuits involving Monsanto in the area of agricultural biotechnology

Monsanto was involved in several high-profile lawsuits, as both plaintiff and defendant. It had been defendant in a number of lawsuits over health and environmental issues related to its products. Monsanto also made frequent use of the courts to defend its patents, particularly in the area of agricultural biotechnology. Since Bayer's acquisition of Monsanto in 2018, Bayer has been involved in litigation related to ex-Monsanto products such as glyphosate, PCBs and dicamba. In 2020, Bayer paid over $10 billion to settle lawsuits involving the glyphosate-based herbicide Roundup.

== Patent litigation ==
Monsanto was one of the first companies to apply the biotechnology industry business model to agriculture, using techniques developed by Genentech and other biotech drug companies in the late 1970s in California. In this business model, companies invest heavily in research and development, and recoup the expenses through the use and enforcement of biological patents.

=== As plaintiff ===
In 1969, Monsanto sued Rohm and Haas for infringement of Monsanto's patent for the herbicide propanil. In Monsanto Co. v. Rohm and Haas Co., the Third Circuit Court of Appeals ruled against Monsanto on the basis that the company had fraudulently procured the patent it sought to enforce.

Since the mid‑1990s, Monsanto has filed suit against 145 individual U.S. farmers for patent infringement and/or breach of contract in connection with its genetically engineered seed but has proceeded through trial against only eleven farmers, all of which Monsanto has won. The Center for Food Safety has listed 90 lawsuits through 2004 by Monsanto against farmers for claims of seed patent violations. Monsanto defends its patents and their use, explaining that patents are necessary to ensure that it is paid for its products and for all the investments it puts into developing products.

As Monsanto argued, the principle behind a farmer’s seed contract is simple: a business must be paid for its product, but that a very small percentage of farmers do not honor this agreement. While many lawsuits involve breach of Monsanto's Technology Agreement, farmers who have not signed this type of contract, but do use the patented seed, can also be found liable for violating Monsanto's patent. That said, Monsanto stated it will not "exercise its patent rights where trace amounts of our patented seed or traits are present in farmer's fields as a result of inadvertent means." The Federal Circuit found that this assurance is binding on Monsanto, so that farmers who don’t harvest more than a trace amount of Monsanto's patented crops "lack an essential element of standing" to challenge Monsanto's patents.

The usual Monsanto claim involves patent infringement by intentionally replanting patented seed. Such activity was found by the United States Supreme Court to constitute patent infringement in Bowman v. Monsanto Co. (2013). The case began in 2007, when Monsanto sued Indiana farmer Vernon Hugh Bowman who in 1999 bought seed for his second planting from a grain elevator – the same elevator to which he and others sold their transgenic crops. The elevator sold the soybeans as commodities, not as seeds for planting. Bowman tested the new seeds, and found that, as he had expected, some were resistant to glyphosate. He intentionally replanted his harvest of GM seeds in subsequent years, supplementing them with more soybeans he bought at the elevator. He informed Monsanto of his activities. Monsanto stated that he was infringing their patents because the soybeans he bought from the elevator were new products that he purchased for use as seeds without a license from Monsanto; Bowman stated that he had not infringed due to patent exhaustion on the first sale of seed to whatever farmers had produced the crops that he bought from the elevator, on the grounds that for seed, all future generations are embodied in the first generation that was originally sold. In 2009 the district court ruled in favor of Monsanto; on appeal, the Federal Circuit upheld the verdict. Bowman appealed to the United States Supreme Court, which granted review, then unanimously affirmed the Federal Circuit on May 13, 2013.

The Supreme Court of Canada had issued a similar decision in Monsanto Canada Inc. v. Schmeiser (2004). That case concerned Percy Schmeiser, who claimed to have discovered that some canola growing on his farm in 1997 was Roundup resistant. Schmeiser harvested the seed from the Roundup resistant plants, and planted the seed in 1998. Monsanto sued Schmeiser for patent infringement for the 1998 planting. Schmeiser claimed that because the 1997 plants grew from seed that was pollinated with pollen blown into his field from neighboring fields, he owned the harvest and was entitled to do with it whatever he wished, including saving the seeds from the 1997 harvest and planting them in 1998. The initial Canadian Federal Court rejected Schmeiser's defense and held for Monsanto, finding that in 1998 Schmeiser had intentionally planted the seeds he had harvested from the wind-seeded crops in 1997, and so patent infringement had indeed occurred. Schmeiser appealed and lost again. Schmeiser appealed to the Supreme Court which took the case and held for Monsanto by a 5‑4 vote in late May 2004. Schmeiser won a partial victory, as the Supreme Court reversed on damages, finding that because Schmeiser did not gain any profit from the infringement, he did not owe Monsanto any damages nor did he have to pay Monsanto's substantial legal bills. The case caused Monsanto's enforcement tactics to be highlighted in the media over the years it took to play out. The case is widely cited or referenced by the anti-GM community in the context of a fear of a company claiming ownership of a farmer’s crop based on the inadvertent presence of GM pollen grain or seed. "The court record shows, however, that it was not just a few seeds from a passing truck, but that Mr Schmeiser was growing a crop of 95–98% pure Roundup Ready plants, a commercial level of purity far higher than one would expect from inadvertent or accidental presence. The judge could not account for how a few wayward seeds or pollen grains could come to dominate hundreds of acres without Mr Schmeiser’s active participation, saying ‘...none of the suggested sources could reasonably explain the concentration or extent of Roundup Ready canola of a commercial quality evident from the results of tests on Schmeiser’s crop’" – in other words, the original presence of Monsanto seed on his land in 1997 was indeed inadvertent, but the crop in 1998 was entirely purposeful.

Monsanto has also successfully sued grain elevators that clean seeds for farmers to replant of inducing patent infringement. For example, Monsanto sued the Pilot Grove Cooperative Elevator in Pilot Grove, Missouri, which had been cleaning conventional seeds for decades before the issuance of the patent that covered genetically engineered seeds. Similarly, a seed cleaner from Indiana, Maurice Parr, was sued by Monsanto for inducing farmers to save seeds in violation of Monsanto’s patent rights. Parr told his customers that cleaning patented seeds for replanting was not infringing activity. The case was settled and in exchange for paying no monetary damages, Parr agreed to an injunction requiring Parr to obtain certification from his clients that their seeds were not Monsanto patented seeds and to advise clients that seed saving of patented seeds is illegal. Mr. Parr was featured in a documentary, Food, Inc.

In one case, a farmer committed misconduct while defending a Monsanto lawsuit, which resulted in criminal penalties. In 2003, a farmer received a four-month prison sentence and ordered to pay $165,649 in restitution after pleading guilty to conspiracy to commit mail fraud during litigation with Monsanto. The same farmer was ordered to pay nearly $3 million in a civil action brought by Monsanto after a jury found him liable for $803,402 worth of damages, which the judge trebled due to willful infringement and added both attorney fees and sanctions for misconduct, all of which were affirmed by the Federal Circuit. Such damages may not be relieved through bankruptcy; in one case where a farmer was found to be willfully infringing Monsanto's patent, the damages awarded to Monsanto were found to be non-dischargeable in the farmer’s Chapter 7 bankruptcy, as they "fell within the Bankruptcy Act’s exception for willful and malicious injuries."

Monsanto has been criticized for a mistaken lawsuit. In 2002, Monsanto mistakenly sued Gary Rinehart of Eagleville, Missouri for patent violation. Rinehart was not a farmer or seed dealer, but sharecropped land with his brother and nephew, who were violating the patent. Monsanto dropped the lawsuit against him when it discovered the mistake. It did not apologize for the mistake or offer to pay Rinehart's attorney fees.

In 2009, Monsanto sued DuPont Pioneer for patent infringement of Roundup Ready patents. DuPont had licensed the patents from Monsanto already, but had added additional glyphosate-resistance genes to its seed, which Monsanto claimed was not allowed in the license. DuPont counter-sued, claiming that Monsanto's patent was invalid. The jury handed down a verdict on August 1, 2012, finding that DuPont not only infringed, but willfully infringed, and awarded a verdict of $1 billion, the fourth-largest patent verdict in the history of the United States. DuPont indicated it would appeal, but settled in 2013.

In 2016, Monsanto filed a lawsuit against its former computer programmer Jiunn-Ren Chen, alleging that he stole files from its systems.

=== As defendant ===
The Public Patent Foundation has unsuccessfully attempted to invalidate several Monsanto patents. In 2006, the foundation filed for ex parte reexamination of four patents, which the United States Patent and Trademark Office (PTO) granted. However, by 2008 the PTO had confirmed the validity of all four patents, with minor amendments to two patents, and allowing new patent claims to issue for the other two patents. In 2011 the Public Patent Foundation filed claims in the Southern District of New York challenging the validity of 23 of Monsanto's patents on genetically modified seed, on behalf of the Organic Seed Growers and Trade Association and 82 other farming associations. The group contended that they were being forced to sue preemptively to protect themselves from being accused of patent infringement should their fields ever become contaminated by Monsanto's genetically modified seed. Monsanto moved for dismissal, citing a public pledge it made not to "exercise its patent rights where trace amounts of our patented seed or traits are present in farmer's fields as a result of inadvertent means." District Court Judge Naomi Buchwald dismissed the lawsuit in 2012, and criticized the plaintiffs in her order for a "transparent effort to create a controversy where none exists." In June 2013, the Federal Circuit affirmed the District Court decision. The Supreme Court declined to hear an appeal in January 2014.

In February 2012, two NGOs, Navdanya and No Patent on Seeds, filed documents opposing an EU patent awarded to Monsanto covering virus-resistant traits of melons. They were joined by Bayer Cropscience. Monsanto had acquired DeRuiter, a seed company, in 2008, which originally filed the patent application. The activists' claim it was not an invention of Monsanto but rather bio-piracy, because the virus-resistant plants originated in India and were registered in international seed banks; they further claimed that conventional breeding methods were used to transfer the virus-resistant genes from an Indian melon to other melons and that European law prohibits patents on conventional breeding. The European Patent Office created a page on its website to explain the case.

== Chemical products and related harms ==
Monsanto operated as an agricultural company, but it was founded in 1901 as a chemical company. In 1997 Monsanto split the chemical sector of its business into an independent company, Solutia Inc. In 2008 Monsanto agreed “to assume financial responsibility for all litigation relating to property damage, personal injury, products liability or premises liability or other damages related to asbestos, PCB, dioxin [in Agent Orange], benzene, vinyl chloride and other chemicals manufactured before the Solutia Spin-off.”

=== Agent Orange ===
In 1980, the first US Agent Orange class-action lawsuit was filed for the injuries military personnel in Vietnam suffered through exposure to dioxins in the defoliant. The chemical companies involved denied that there was a link between Agent Orange and the veterans' medical problems. On May 7, 1984, seven chemical companies settled the class-action suit out of court just hours before jury selection was to begin, offering $180 million as compensation if the veterans dropped all claims against them. Slightly over 45% of the sum was ordered to be paid by Monsanto alone.

In 2004, Monsanto, along with Dow and other chemical companies, were sued in a US court by a group of Vietnamese for the effects of its Agent Orange defoliant, used by the US military in the Vietnam War. The case was dismissed, and plaintiffs appealed all the way to the Supreme Court, which also denied the appeal.

After seven years of litigation, in 2013 Monsanto reached a settlement with the town of Nitro, West Virginia, agreeing to pay $93 million for compensatory damages, cleanup, and ongoing monitoring of dioxin contamination in the area around a plant where Agent Orange was made.

=== Dioxin ===
In a case that ran from February 1984 through October 1987, Monsanto was the defendant in the longest civil jury trial in U.S. history, Kemner v. Monsanto. The case involved a group of plaintiffs who claimed to have been poisoned by dioxin in 1979 when a train derailed in Sturgeon, Missouri. Tank cars on the train carried a chemical used to make wood preservatives and "small quantities of a dioxin called 2, 3, 7, 8, TCDD... formed as a part of the manufacturing process." The initial outcome was mixed. "The jurors, after deliberating more than two months, agreed with Monsanto that the plaintiffs had suffered no physical harm from exposure to dioxin. But they accepted the plaintiffs' argument that Monsanto had failed to alter its manufacturing process to eliminate dioxin as a byproduct and that it had failed to warn the public about dioxin's harmfulness. Most of the plaintiffs were awarded only one dollar each for actual losses, but they were awarded $16.2 million in punitive damages." Monsanto appealed the judgments and won on all counts.

=== Polychlorinated biphenyls (PCBs) ===
In the early 1990s, Monsanto faced several lawsuits over harm caused by PCBs from workers at companies such as Westinghouse that bought PCBs from Monsanto and used them to build electrical equipment. Monsanto and its customers, such as Westinghouse and GE, also faced litigation from third parties, such as workers at scrap yards that bought used electrical equipment and broke them down to reclaim valuable metals. Monsanto settled some of these cases and won the others, on the grounds that it had clearly told its customers that PCBs were dangerous chemicals and that protective procedures needed to be implemented.

In 2003, Monsanto and Solutia Inc., a Monsanto corporate spin-off, reached a $700 million settlement with the residents of West Anniston, Alabama who had been affected by the manufacturing and dumping of PCBs. In a trial lasting six weeks, the jury found that "Monsanto had engaged in outrageous behavior, and held the corporations and its corporate successors liable on all six counts it considered – including negligence, nuisance, wantonness and suppression of the truth."

In 2014, the Los Angeles County Superior Court found that Monsanto was not liable for cancers claimed to be from PCBs permeating the food supply of three plaintiffs who had developed non-Hodgkin's lymphoma. After a four-week trial, the jury found that Monsanto’s production and sale of PCBs between 1935 and 1977 were not substantial causes of the cancer.

In 2015, the cities of Spokane, San Diego, and San Jose initiated lawsuits against Monsanto to recover cleanup costs for PCB-contaminated sites, alleging that Monsanto continued to sell PCBs without adequate warnings after they knew of their toxicity. Monsanto issued a media statement concerning the San Diego case, claiming that improper use or disposal by third-parties, of a lawfully sold product, was not the company's responsibility.

In July 2015, a St Louis county court in Missouri found that Monsanto, Solutia, Pharmacia and Pfizer were not liable for a series of deaths and injuries caused by PCBs manufactured by Monsanto Chemical Company until 1977. The trial took nearly a month and the jury took a day of deliberations to return a verdict against the plaintiffs from throughout the USA.

In May 2016, A Missouri state jury ordered Monsanto to pay $46.5 million in a case where 3 plaintiffs claimed PCB exposure caused non-Hodgkin lymphoma.

In December 2016, the state of Washington filed suit in King County. The state sought damages and clean up costs related to PCBs. In March 2018 Ohio Attorney General Mike DeWine also filed a lawsuit against Monsanto over health issues posed by PCBs.

On November 21, 2019, a federal judge denied a bid by Monsanto to dismiss a lawsuit filed by LA County calling the company to clean up cancer-causing PCBs from Los Angeles County waterways and storm sewer pipelines The lawsuit calls for Monsanto to pay for cleanup of PCBs from dozens of waterways, including the LA River, San Gabriel River and the Dominguez Watershed.

In June 2020, Bayer agreed to pay $650 million to settle local lawsuits related to Monsanto's pollution of public waters in various areas of the United States with PCBs. On December 1, 2020, U.S. District Judge Fernando M. Olguin rejected Bayer's proposed $650 million settlement and allowed Monsanto-related lawsuits involving PCB to proceed. In April 2024, a Washington state appeals court overturned a $185 million verdict against Bayer.

In October 2025, NC state university filed a lawsuit against Monsanto over PCBs used in construction of Poe Hall on campus in 1971. The National Institute for Occupational Safety and Health is currently evaluating the health hazards.

=== Alachlor ===
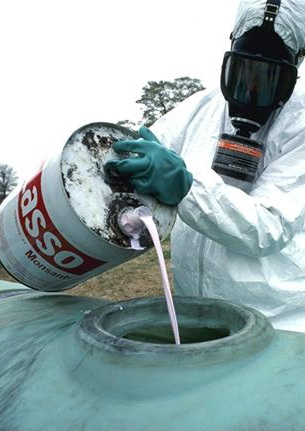
Transferring Monsanto's Lasso herbicide

Alachlor is the second most widely used herbicide in the United States; its use as a herbicide has been banned in the European Union.

In 2012, a French court found Monsanto guilty of chemical poisoning of Paul François, a farmer who had used the herbicide Lasso, a trade name for alachlor. This is the first such case to be heard in France and is considered "a judgment that could lend weight to other health claims against pesticides." In 2015 a French appeals court upheld the ruling and ordered the company to "fully compensate" the grower.

=== Roundup ===
The active ingredient in Roundup, the most widely used herbicide, is glyphosate. As of October 30, 2019, there were over 40,000 plaintiffs involved with a suit saying that glyphosate-based herbicides caused their cancer. Most of these suits were filed after 2015, when the World Health Organization's International Agency for Research on Cancer (IARC) published a report linking glyphosate to cancer in humans. Monsanto denies that Roundup is carcinogenic.

There is limited evidence that human cancer risk might increase as a result of occupational exposure to large amounts of glyphosate, such as agricultural work, but no good evidence of such a risk from home use, such as in domestic gardening. The consensus among national pesticide regulatory agencies and scientific organizations, including the European Commission, and the US Environmental Protection Agency (EPA), is that labeled uses of glyphosate are not likely to be carcinogenic to humans.

In March 2015, the California Office of Environmental Health Hazard Assessment announced plans to have glyphosate listed as a known carcinogen based on the IARC assessment. In 2016, Monsanto filed a lawsuit objecting to glyphosate being added to California's list of carcinogens. In January 2017, the Fresno County Superior Court rejected the case. The state of California filed a motion to dismiss the case. Monsanto appealed on March 22.

In 2016, in response to a lawsuit by Emanuel Giglio, the Southern District of California ruled that Giglio's cancer was not Monsanto's fault and that "FIFRA preempted Giglio's claim of a failure to warn the EPA about the dangers of glyphosate".

In the In re: Roundup Products Liability multidistrict litigation a Daubert hearing was held in March 2018 on general causation as to non-Hodgkin’s lymphoma. This case consolidated over 300 federal lawsuits that allege Monsanto did not adequately warn consumers about the risks of using Roundup. Monsanto argued that plaintiff's claims were based on "junk science" and sought a summary judgment dismissing the cases. In July 2018, the federal court judge overseeing the cases ruled that the plaintiffs could proceed with their lawsuits, finding that a reasonable jury could conclude that glyphosate can cause cancer in humans. Monsanto's motion for summary judgment was denied.

In March 2017, 40 plaintiffs filed a lawsuit in the Alameda County Superior Court, a branch of the California Superior Court, against Monsanto alleging damages related to certain forms of cancer caused by Roundup.

On 10 August 2018, Dewayne Johnson, who has non-Hodgkin's lymphoma, was awarded $289 million in damages (cut to $78 million pending appeal then reduced to $21 million after appeal) after a jury in San Francisco found that Monsanto had failed to adequately warn consumers of cancer risks posed by the herbicide. Johnson had routinely used two different glyphosate formulations in his work as a groundskeeper, Roundup and another Monsanto product called Ranger Pro. The jury's verdict addressed the question of whether Monsanto knowingly failed to warn consumers that Roundup could be harmful, but not whether Roundup causes cancer. Court documents from the case revealed the company's efforts to influence scientific research via ghostwriting.

In March 2019, a man was awarded $80 million in a lawsuit claiming Roundup was a substantial factor in his cancer. In July 2019, U.S. District Judge Vince Chhabria reduced the settlement to $25 million. Chhabria stated that a punitive award was appropriate because the evidence "easily supported a conclusion that Monsanto was more concerned with tamping down safety inquiries and manipulating public opinion than it was with ensuring its product is safe." Chhabria stated that there is evidence on both sides concerning whether glyphosate causes cancer and that the behavior of Monsanto showed "a lack of concern about the risk that its product might be carcinogenic." A reputation manager hired by Monsanto posed as a reporter at this trial.

The ruling was criticized by some legal and science experts as lacking a firm scientific background and being instead an example of "a growing trend in mass tort litigation" where "even if the scientific proof is disputed (and possibly lacking), jurors should award damages for what is, effectively, bad corporate behavior"

However, Judge Chhabria pointed to scientific testimony from epidemiology, oncology, and other medical specialties in the first three trials. Then he wrote, "Monsanto lost the battle of the experts."

On 13 May 2019 a jury in California ordered Bayer to pay a couple $2 billion in damages after finding that the company had failed to adequately inform consumers of the possible carcinogenicity of Roundup. On July 26, 2019, an Alameda County judge cut the settlement to $86.7 million, stating that the judgement by the jury exceeded legal precedent.

In June 2020, Bayer agreed to settle over a hundred thousand Roundup lawsuits, agreeing to pay $8.8 to $9.6 billion to settle those claims, and $1.5 billion for any future claims. The settlement does not include three cases that have already gone to jury trials and are being appealed.

In March 2025, a jury in Georgia returned a $2.1 billion verdict against Monsanto parent company Bayer on behalf of a man who claimed his non-Hodkin's lymphoma was caused by exposure to Roundup. It was one of the largest glyphosate-cancer verdicts to date.

In February 2026, Bayer announced a proposed settlement class-action to resolve pending and future glyphosate-injury litigation. According to the proposal, which requires judicial approval, Monsanto would contribute $7.25 billion to resolve the lawsuits.

=== Penncap-M ===
The insecticide Penncap-M, which has methyl parathion as an active ingredient, was classified as hazardous waste and banned by the EPA as of the end of 2013.

On November 21, 2019, Monsanto pled guilty to unlawfully spraying a banned pesticide, as it had sprayed Penncap-M at its Valley Farm research facility on Maui, in 2014. Monsanto admitted as part of the plea that it had Valley Farm workers return to the sprayed field after 7 days despite knowing that they should have been prohibited from entering for 31 days. The company also admitted to unlawfully storing and transporting hazardous waste, as it had stores of Penncap-M at three other locations in Hawaii, and did not get permits to store it nor identified it on shipping manifests when transporting it on public highways. The company agreed to pay a fine of $10 million in exchange for deferred prosecution of the storage and transportation charges. As part of this deal, $6 million will be paid as a criminal fine, while $4 million will be paid to entities of the Hawaiian state government for community service.

=== Dicamba ===
Arkansas and Missouri banned the sale and use of the pesticide dicamba in July 2017 in response to complaints of crop damage due to drift. In response, Monsanto, a producer of dicamba, sued the state of Arkansas to stop the ban; this lawsuit was dismissed in February 2018. On January 27, 2020, the first ever lawsuit concerning Dicamba-related products began in Missouri. The lawsuit, which had been filed in November 2016, involves a peach farmer who alleged that Dicamba-based herbicides caused significant damage to his crops and trees. On February 14, 2020, the jury involved in the lawsuit ruled against Monsanto acquisitor Bayer and its co-defendant BASF and found in favor of the peach grower, Bader Farms owner Bill Bader. Bayer and BASF were also ordered to pay Bader $15 million in damages. On February 15, 2020, Monsanto and BASF were ordered to pay an additional $250 million in punitive damages.

In June 2020, Bayer agreed to a settlement of up to $400 million for all 2015-2020 crop year dicamba claims, not including the $250 million judgement. On November 25, 2020, U.S. District Judge Stephen Limbaugh Jr. reduced the punitive damage amount in the Bader Farms case to $60 million.

== Other legal actions ==
=== As defendant ===
==== Bribery in Indonesia ====
In 2005, the US DOJ filed a Deferred Prosecution Agreement in which Monsanto admitted to violations of the Foreign Corrupt Practices Act (15 U.S.C. § 78dd-1) and entering false entries into its books and records (15 U.S.C § 78m(b)(2) & (5)). Monsanto also agreed to pay a $1.5 million fine.

The case involved bribes paid to an Indonesian official. A senior manager at Monsanto directed an Indonesian consulting firm to give a $50,000 bribe to a high-level official in Indonesia's environment ministry in 2002, related to the agency's assessment on its genetically modified cotton. Monsanto told the firm to disguise an invoice for the bribe as "consulting fees".

Furthermore, the U.S. Securities and Exchange Commission noted that Monsanto's Indonesian affiliates made illicit payments to at least 140 current or former Indonesian officials and their families, amounting to at least US$700,000. Monsanto financed payments partially through unauthorized, improperly documented and inflated sales of the company’s pesticide products in Indonesia. On March 5, 2008, the deferred prosecution agreement against Monsanto was dismissed with prejudice (unopposed by the Department of Justice) by the U.S. District Court for the District of Columbia, that Monsanto had complied fully with the terms of the agreement.

==== Spread of experimental glyphosate-resistant wheat ====
In 2014, Monsanto reached a settlement with soft wheat farmers over the 2013 discovery of experimental glyphosate-resistant wheat in a field in Oregon which had led to South Korea and Japan temporarily stopping some US wheat importation. The settlement included the establishment of a $2.125 million fund for economically affected soft-wheat farmers.

==== Right to privacy ====
In May 2019, Le Monde and France 2 announced that they had a copy of the "Monsanto France database" that the public relations firm Fleishman-Hillard compiled in 2016, the year after the IARC classification of glyphosate, and that the database listed private data about journalists, scientists, and politicians who were evaluated on a scale of 1–5 concerning their political opinions on, for example, "agriculture, pesticides, GMOs, and health..." . Le Monde and one of its reporters filed a legal complaint in the High Court of Paris on 26 April 2019, based in part on the right to privacy. Seven people listed in the database complained to the French data privacy agency, the Commission nationale de l'informatique et des libertés ("National Commission on Informatics and Liberty"), which in July 2021 fined Monsanto €400,000 for secretly compiling the lists.

=== As plaintiff or appellant ===
==== rBST labelling ====
In 2003, Monsanto sued Oakhurst Dairy over Oakhurst's label on its milk cartons that said "Our farmer's pledge: no artificial hormones," referring to the use of bovine somatotropin (rBST). Monsanto argued that the label implied that Oakhurst milk was superior to milk from cows treated with rBST, which harmed Monsanto's business. The two companies settled out of court, and it was announced that Oakhurst would add the word "used" at the end of its label, and note that the U.S. FDA claims there is no major difference between milk from rBST-treated and non rBST-treated cows.

==== Monsanto v Geertson ====
In 2010, the U.S. Supreme Court ruled in Monsanto Co. v. Geertson Seed Farms. The case concerned an injunction against the planting of Monsanto's genetically engineered Roundup Ready alfalfa (RRA). In 2005, the United States Department of Agriculture's Animal and Plant Health Inspection Service (APHIS) had deregulated RRA based on an Environmental Assessment (EA) of Monsanto's RRA. In 2006, Geertson Seed Farm and others filed suit in a California district court against the APHIS' deregulation of RRA. The district court disallowed APHIS' deregulation of RRA and issued an injunction against any new planting of RRA pending the preparation of a much more extensive Environmental Impact Statement (EIS). The court also refused to allow a partial deregulation. Monsanto and others appealed that decision and lost, then appealed to the U.S. Supreme Court. In 2010, the Supreme Court reversed the district court's decision. They stated that before a court disallows a partial deregulation, a plaintiff must show that it has suffered irreparable injury. "The District Court abused its discretion in enjoining APHIS from effecting a partial deregulation and in prohibiting the planting of RRA pending the agency’s completion of its detailed environmental review." The Supreme court did not consider the district court's ruling disallowing RRA's deregulation and consequently RRA was still a regulated crop waiting for APHIS's completion of an EIS. At the time, both sides claimed victory. This was the first ruling of the United States Supreme Court on genetically engineered crops. After APHIS prepared an Environmental Impact Statement for RRA, in 2012 it was deregulated again.

==== Glyphosate-resistant sugar beets ====
On January 23, 2008, the Center for Food Safety, the Sierra Club, and the Organic Seed Alliance and High Mowing Seeds filed a lawsuit against USDA-APHIS regarding their decision to deregulate a glyphosate-resistant sugar beet developed by Monsanto and KWS SAAT AG in 2005. The organizations expressed concerns regarding glyphosate-resistant sugar beets' ability to potentially cross pollinate with conventional sugar beet. On September 21, 2009, U.S. District Judge Jeffrey S. White, U.S. District Court for the Northern District of California, ruled that USDA-APHIS had violated Federal law in deregulating glyphosate-resistant sugar beet and on August 13, 2010, he ruled further, revoking the deregulation of glyphosate-resistant sugar beet and declaring it unlawful for growers to plant glyphosate-resistant sugar beet in the spring of 2011. As a result of this ruling, growers were permitted to harvest and process their crop at the end of the 2010 growing season, yet a ban on new plantings was enacted. After Judge White's ruling, USDA-APHIS prepared an Environmental Assessment seeking partial deregulation of glyphosate-resistant sugar beet and allowed GM seedlings to be planted. In November 2010, in response to a suit by the original parties, Judge White ordered the destruction of the plantings. In February 2011, a federal appeals court for the Northern district of California in San Francisco, citing the Supreme Court's 2010 decision on RRA, overturned the ruling, concluding that "The Plaintiffs have failed to show a likelihood of irreparable injury. Biology, geography, field experience, and permit restrictions make irreparable injury unlikely." APHIS developed requirements that growers had to follow if handling glyphosate-resistant sugar beet while it was regulated. In July 2012, after completing an Environmental Impact Assessment and a Plant Pest Risk Assessment the USDA deregulated Monsanto's Roundup Ready sugar beets again.

==== Avaaz subpoena ====
In January 2018, Monsanto requested that the political activist group Avaaz hand over all documents the organization held on their campaigning related to the safety of glyphosate. Lawyers for Monsanto said they planned to use the documentation to focus on relations between Avaaz and plaintiff lawyers in their defense during an upcoming court case involving two plaintiffs in Missouri who say their cancer was caused by exposure to Monsanto's "Roundup" herbicide. On September 5, 2018, a New York judge sided with Avaaz. The judge stated that the subpoena "risked "chilling" free speech and political activity".

== Investigations ==
=== 2009 antitrust investigation ===
In 2009, Monsanto came under scrutiny from the U.S. Department of Justice, which began investigating whether the company's activities in the soybean markets were breaking anti-trust rules. In 2010, the Department of Justice created a website through which comments on "Agriculture and Antitrust Enforcement Issues in Our 21st Century Economy" could be submitted; over 15,000 comments were submitted including a letter by 14 State Attorneys General. The comments are publicly available. On November 16, 2012, Monsanto announced that it had received written notification from the U.S. Department of Justice that the Antitrust Division had concluded its inquiry and that the Department of Justice had closed the inquiry without taking any enforcement action. Opponents of Monsanto's seed patenting and licensing practices expressed frustration that the Department of Justice released no information about the results of the inquiry.

=== Brofiscin Quarry ===
Brofiscin Quarry was used as a waste site from about 1965 to 1972 and accepted waste from BP, Veolia, and Monsanto. A 2005 report by the Environment Agency Wales found that the quarry contained up to 75 toxic substances, including heavy metals, Agent Orange, and polychlorinated biphenyls (PCBs). The Environment Agency of the UK investigated who the "responsible parties" were who should be held liable for clean up costs, and in February 2011, the Guardian reported that Monsanto had agreed to help with the costs of remediation, but did not accept responsibility for the pollution. A webpage at the Environmental Agency site put up at around that time stated: "We have completed our extensive enquiries to identify those we consider should be held responsible under the contaminated land laws and be held liable for the cost of remediating Brofiscin Quarry. We are at an advanced stage in our consultations with BP, Veolia and Monsanto to provide them with the opportunity to help remediate the land on a voluntary basis. We expect to make further progress on this matter in the next few months. If this approach is unsuccessful, we have the power to carry out the work needed ourselves and recover our costs. The three companies have been identified under the legislation as inheriting the liabilities of companies who were associated with depositing wastes at the quarry." The three companies reached settlements to cover the cleanup cost, according to an announcement by Natural Resources Wales in July 2015.

Doubts persist whether full disclosure and assumption of responsibility has yet been achieved regarding others in this family of sites which received waste from Monsanto Newport works. Other sites considered relevant include Maendy and Sutton Walls.

=== SEC investigation ===
In February 2016, Monsanto agreed to pay an $80 million settlement after a U.S. Securities and Exchange Commission investigation found that Monsanto had misstated its earnings in filings over a 3-year period. The misleading statements were connected to Monsanto's failure to fully account for the costs involved in their Roundup rebate programs.

== Disputes ==
=== 1997 WTVT news story ===
This is a case where Monsanto was not a party, but was alleged to have been involved in the events under dispute. In 1997, the news division of WTVT (Channel 13), a Fox–owned station in Tampa, Florida, planned to air an investigative report by Steve Wilson and Jane Akre on the health risks allegedly associated with Monsanto's bovine growth hormone product, Posilac. Just before the story was to air, Fox received a threatening letter from Monsanto, saying the reporters were biased and that the story would damage the company. Fox tried to work with the reporters to address Monsanto's concerns, and the negotiations between Fox and the reporters broke down. Both reporters were eventually fired. Wilson and Akre alleged the firing was for retaliation, while WTVT contended they were fired for insubordination. The reporters then sued Fox/WTVT in Florida state court under the state's whistleblower statute. In 2000, a Florida jury found that while there was no evidence Fox/WTVT had bowed to any pressure from Monsanto to alter the story, Akre, but not Wilson, was a whistleblower and was unjustly fired. Fox appealed the decision stating that under Florida law, a whistleblower can only act if "a law, rule, or regulation”" has been broken and argued that the FCC's news distortion policy did not fit that definition. The appeals court overturned the verdict, finding that Akre was not a whistleblower because of the Florida "legislature's requirement that agency statements that fit the definition of a “rule” (must) be formally adopted (rules). Recognizing an uncodified agency policy developed through the adjudicative process as the equivalent of a formally adopted rule is not consistent with this policy, and it would expand the scope of conduct that could subject an employer to liability beyond what Florida's Legislature could have contemplated when it enacted the whistle-blower's statute."

=== Industrial Bio-Test Laboratories scandal ===
In 1981, three senior staff of Industrial Bio-Test Laboratories (IBT) and one from Monsanto Corporation were indicted on federal charges of mail fraud and making false statements to the government, and three were convicted in 1983 (a mistrial was declared for the charges against one executive for medical reasons). IBT had performed toxicology testing for numerous chemical manufacturers, including Monsanto, whose products were among those supported by falsified IBT data. One of the convicted executives, toxicologist Paul Wright, had previously worked for Monsanto before being assigned to IBT, where he spent 18 months overseeing toxicity studies on an antimicrobial product that Monsanto was developing, triclocarban (TCC). After the studies were complete, Wright rejoined Monsanto. Court records and subsequent investigations showed that Monsanto relied on IBT's compromised studies for regulatory submissions despite Monsanto personnel being aware of the data-quality issues. The revelations of misconduct by IBT Labs led to the establishment of Good Laboratory Practice standards and regulations for industrial testing.

In 1991, Philip Smith, a former assistant toxicologist at IBT, testified in a trial in which Monsanto was being sued by workers at Westinghouse over PCBs, that final toxicology reports on PCBs provided to Monsanto by IBT contained falsified data.

=== Asgrow ===
In late 2006, the Correctional Tribunal of Carcassonne, France, ordered two directors of Monsanto subsidiary Asgrow to pay a €15,000 fine related to their knowledge of the presence of unauthorized genetically modified organisms (GMOs) in bags of seeds imported by Asgrow on April 13, 2000.

== False advertising ==
=== US ===
In 1996, the New York Times reported that: "Dennis C. Vacco, the Attorney General of New York, ordered the company to pull ads that said Roundup was "safer than table salt" and "practically nontoxic" to mammals, birds and fish. The company withdrew the spots, but also said that the phrase in question was permissible under EPA guidelines."

=== UK ===
In 1999, Monsanto was condemned by the UK Advertising Standards Authority (ASA) for making "confusing, misleading, unproven and wrong" claims about its products over the course of a £1 million advertising campaign. The ASA ruled that Monsanto had presented its opinions "as accepted fact" and had published "wrong" and "unproven" scientific claims. Monsanto responded with an apology and claimed it was not intending to deceive and instead "did not take sufficiently into account the difference in culture between the UK and the US in the way some of this information was presented."

=== France ===
In 2001, French environmental and consumer rights campaigners brought a case against Monsanto for misleading the public about the environmental impact of its herbicide Roundup, on the basis that glyphosate, Roundup's main ingredient, is classed as "dangerous for the environment" and "toxic for aquatic organisms" by the European Union. Monsanto's advertising for Roundup had presented it as biodegradable and as leaving the soil clean after use. In 2007, Monsanto was convicted of false advertising and was fined 15,000 euros. Monsanto's French distributor Scotts France was also fined 15,000 euros. Both defendants were ordered to pay damages of 5,000 euros to the Brittany Water and Rivers Association and 3,000 euros to the CLCV (Consommation Logement Cadre de vie), one of the two main general consumer associations in France. Monsanto appealed and the court upheld the verdict; Monsanto appealed again to the French Supreme Court, and in 2009 it also upheld the verdict.

=== Brazil ===
In August 2012, a Brazilian Regional Federal Court ordered Monsanto to pay a $250,000 fine for false advertising. In 2004, advertising that related to the use of GM soya seed, and the herbicide glyphosate used in its cultivation, claimed it was beneficial to the conservation of the environment. The federal prosecutor maintained that Monsanto misrepresented the amount of herbicide required and stated that "there is no scientific certainty that soybeans marketed by Monsanto use less herbicide." The presiding judge condemned Monsanto and called the advertisement "abusive and misleading propaganda." The prosecutor held that the goal of the advertising was to prepare the market for the purchase of genetically modified soybean seed (sale of which was then banned) and the herbicide used on it, at a time when the approval of a Brazilian biosafety law, enacted in 2005, was being discussed in the country.

=== South Africa ===
In March 2014, the South African Advertising Standards Authority (ASA) upheld a complaint, made by the African Centre for Biosafety, that Monsanto had made "unsubstantiated" claims about genetically modified crops in its radio advertisements, and ordered that these adverts be pulled. In March 2015 after considering further documentation from Monsanto, the ASA reversed its ruling.
