= C6H3Cl2NO2 =

The molecular formula C_{6}H_{3}Cl_{2}NO_{2} (molar mass: 192.01 g/mol) may refer to:

- Clopyralid, a selective herbicide
- Dichloronitrobenzene
  - 1,2-Dichloro-4-nitrobenzene, an intermediate in the synthesis of agrochemicals
  - 1,3-Dichloro-2-nitrobenzene
  - 1,4-Dichloro-2-nitrobenzene
