= Landfills in the United Kingdom =

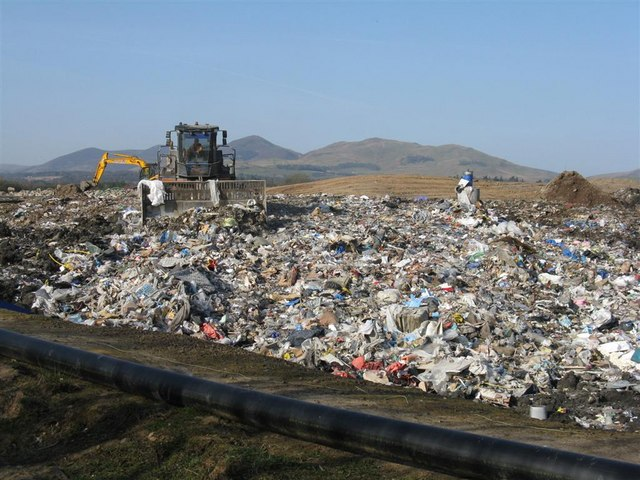
Landfill site at Oatslie, Scotland, in 2009

Landfills in the United Kingdom were historically the most commonly used option for waste disposal. Up until the 1980s, policies of successive governments had endorsed the "dilute and disperse" approach. Britain has since adopted the appropriate European legislation and landfill sites are generally operated as full containment facilities. However, many dilute and disperse sites remain throughout Britain.

== Current policy ==
The use of landfill is recognised as the Best practicable environmental option (BPEO) for the disposal of certain waste types. In order to apply the principles of the EC 5th Programme of Policy & Action in relation to the environment and sustainable development the Government has prepared a waste strategy. The waste strategy policy on landfill is to promote landfill practices which will achieve stabilisation of landfill sites within one generation.

This policy is to be implemented through guidance set out in a revised series of waste management papers on landfill. In addition, the United Kingdom and many other countries are parties to the 1992 agreement on sustainable development at the Earth Summit. The United Kingdom's strategy for sustainable development was published in 1994. In the field of waste management, the strategy requires that the present generation should deal with the waste it produces and not leave problems to be dealt with by future generations (a generation is considered to be 30–50 years).

== Taxation ==
In recognition of the increasing quantities of waste that are being disposed of to landfill the Government has, from October 1996, imposed a tax on certain types of waste deposited in landfill. Landfill operators licensed under the Environmental Protection Act (EPA) or the Pollution Control & Local Government Order 1978 etc. were required to register their liability for the tax by 31 August 1996.

Landfill operators who also use their site for recycling, incineration or sorting waste can apply to have the relevant area designated a tax-free site. The tax is administered by HM Revenue & Customs (and is known as the landfill tax) and it has been estimated that the tax will raise approximately £500m a year for the exchequer.

The scope of the tax is set down in the Landfill Tax Regulations 1996 (SI 1527). The Landfill Tax (Contaminated Land) Order 1996 (SI 1529) sets out provisions for exempting waste generated as a result of cleaning up historically contaminated land. The tax is based on the weight of the waste to be deposited, thereby applying the polluter pays principle. It also aims to promote a more sustainable approach to waste management by providing an incentive to dispose of less waste and to recover more value from waste through recycling. All waste is taxed at £80.00 per tonne (as of April 2014), except for the following lower risk wastes where the tax is £2.50 per tonne:

- Naturally occurring rocks and soils, sand, gravel, clean building or demolition stone, top soil, peat, silt and dredgings
- Ceramic or cemented materials, glass, ceramics, concrete.
- Processed or prepared mineral materials which have not been used or contaminated: moulding sands and clays, clay absorbents, manmade mineral fibres, silica and mica.
- Furnace slags.
- Low activity organic compounds.
- Gypsum and calcium sulphate based plaster, if disposed of in a separate containment cell on a mixed landfill site or in an inactive only site.

== Locations ==
Online sites record the locations of landfills in the United Kingdom:

- For landfills in Scotland see the Waste infrastructure maps section of the Scottish Environment Protection Agency website.
- Data for landfills in Northern Ireland appear as lists in the Public Registers section of the Northern Ireland Environment Agency website.

Some expanding urban areas have encroached onto former landfills.

== Legislation and licensing ==
With implementation of the Waste Management Licensing Regulations 1994 in May 1994 Part I of the Control of Pollution Act 1974 was finally replaced by Part II of the EPA. The EPA seeks to build on a system put in place by Control of Pollution Act (COPA) with stricter licensing controls and other provisions aimed at ensuring waste handling, disposal and recovery operations do not harm the environment. Responsibility for waste rests with the person who produces it together with everyone who handles it, right through to final disposal or reclamation. Only “fit and proper” persons may run waste sites and responsibility for a closed landfill site will continue until all risks of pollution or harm to human health and safety are past.

The licensing regime enables waste regulation authorities (WRAs) to refuse to accept the surrender of a license. Prior to enablement of the 1990 Act in May 1996, operators could hand back their licenses without restriction, leaving the public purse to cover any restoration and clean-up liabilities. Concern about the scale of those liabilities prompted operators to return licenses for nearly 25% of the waste disposal sites in England and Wales shortly before the new regime came into force. Now under section 39 of the 1990 Act, a WRA can not accept the surrender of a license unless it is satisfied that the condition of the land arising from its use for treating, keeping or disposing of waste is “unlikely” to cause environmental damage or harm human health.

The EC Landfill Directive (from Limiting Landfill: A Consultation paper on limiting landfill to meet the EC Landfill Directive's targets for the landfill of biodegradable municipal waste) Council Directive 1999/31/EC on the landfill of waste (better known as the Landfill Directive) was agreed in Europe at Council on 26 April 1999 and came into force in the EU on 16 July 2001. It was transposed into United Kingdom law in 2002. The full text of the Directive was published in the Official Journal of the European Communities L182/1 on 16 July 1999 and is available on the Europa Website – a site dedicated to European law.

The Directive aims to harmonise controls on the landfill of waste throughout the European Union, and its main focus is on common standards for the design, operation, and aftercare of landfill sites. It also aims to reduce the amount of methane, a powerful greenhouse gas, emitted from landfill sites. The United Kingdom has a wider legally binding target, agreed at Kyoto in December 1997, to cut emissions of greenhouse gases by 12.5% below 1990 levels by 2008–2012.

With this latter aim in mind, the Directive sets three progressive targets for Member States to reduce the amount of their municipal biodegradable waste sent to landfill. Biodegradable waste was focused upon because it is the biodegradable element of waste which breaks down to produce methane. The targets are set for an important waste stream - biodegradable municipal waste. The Directive requires that the strategy for achieving the targets must also address the need to reduce all biodegradable waste going to landfill.

== Targets ==
The targets contained in Article 5 of the Directive requires that:

- 1. Member States shall set up a national strategy for the implementation of the reduction of biodegradable waste going to landfills, not later than two years after the date laid down in Article 18(1) and notify the Commission of this strategy. This strategy should include measures to achieve the targets set out in paragraph 2 by means of in particular, recycling, composting, biogas production or materials/energy recovery.
- 2. This strategy shall ensure that:

(a) not later than 5 years after the date laid down in Article 18(1), biodegradable municipal waste going to landfills must be reduced to 75% of the total amount (by weight) of biodegradable municipal waste produced in 1995 or the latest year before 1995 for which standardised EUROSTAT data is available.

(b) not later than 8 years after the date laid down in Article 18(1), biodegradable municipal waste going to landfills must be reduced to 50% of the total amount (by weight) of biodegradable municipal waste produced in 1995 or the latest year before 1995 for which standardised EUROSTAT data is available.
(c) not later than 15 years after the date laid down in Article 18(1), biodegradable municipal waste going to landfills must be reduced to 35% of the total amount (by weight) of biodegradable municipal waste produced in 1995 or the latest year before 1995 for which standardised EUROSTAT data is available.

Two years before the date referred to in paragraph (c) the Council shall re-examine the above target, on the basis of a report from the Commission on the practical experience gained by Member States in the pursuance of the targets laid down in paragraphs (a) and (b) accompanied, if appropriate, by a proposal with a view to confirming or amending this target in order to ensure a high level of environmental protection.

Member States which in 1995 or the latest year before 1995 for which standardised EUROSTAT data is available put more than 80% of their collected municipal waste to landfill may postpone the attainment of the targets set out in paragraphs (a), (b) or (c) by a period not exceeding four years...

== Meeting the targets ==
The United Kingdom disposes of the vast majority of its municipal waste (over 85%) [this is out of date - most recent Eurostat data indicates 49% of waste landfilled, 25% recycled, 14% composted, 12% incinerated in 2011] by sending it to landfill, and meeting the targets presents a substantial challenge to this country. The targets in the EC Landfill Directive mean that the United Kingdom will have to take action on two levels.

- i) Limit the use of landfill to ensure that no more than the allowed amount of biodegradable municipal waste is landfilled by the target dates.
- ii) Build up alternatives to landfill to deal with the diverted waste, encourage the diversion of waste away from landfill towards these alternatives, and encourage initiatives which minimise the amount of biodegradable municipal waste produced.

The first action is the subject of the consultation document Limiting Landfill: A Consultation paper on limiting landfill to meet the EC Landfill Directive's targets for the landfill of biodegradable municipal waste. The targets in the Directive are legally binding on the United Kingdom and must be met. The Government considers that the scale of the change needed to meet the targets, and the relatively short timetable for bringing about this change, mean that a statutory instrument to limit the use of landfill for biodegradable municipal waste is essential. DETR aims to include proposals for a statutory limit for landfill in the final waste strategy for England.

The second action is dealt with in the draft waste strategy for England and Wales, A way with waste. The draft strategy has a strong presumption against landfill, and sets out goals for the sustainable management of municipal waste: recycling and composting 30% of household waste by 2010, and recovering 45% of municipal waste by the same date. The draft strategy also states that, by 2015, the Government expects that we will need to recover value from two thirds of our household waste, and that at least half of that will need to be through recycling or composting. It also reiterates the Government's support for the principle of Best Practicable Environmental Option, and the waste hierarchy, within which recycling and composting should be considered before recovery of energy from waste.

The Landfill Directive was implemented on 16 July 2001 and aims to improve standards and reduce negative effects on the environment, groundwater, surface waters, soil and air and overall limit the global impact of waste disposal. In England and Wales, the LFD has been implemented through Pollution Prevention and Control Regulations (PPC) to give a single regulatory regime. All existing and new landfill sites will be brought into this regime. Sites closed before 16 July 2001 remain within the original Waste Management Licensing (WML) regime. Existing landfills have a transitional period within which they must comply with the LFD, but are required to comply with certain aspects by key dates, and all aspects by 16 July 2007. All new sites must fully comply from the start.

The LFD requires that all sites are formally classified as either accepting wastes that are hazardous, non-hazardous or inert and that the engineered containment systems required for each classification of landfill are designed within a risk assessment framework (groundwater, landfill gas and stability). The LFD aims to prevent co-disposal of hazardous wastes from July 2004 and ban certain wastes to landfill e.g. tyres, liquid wastes, explosive, highly flammable, corrosive and oxidising wastes. Article 5 requires that the amount of biodegradable waste going to landfill is reduced.

From 2004, pre-treatment of waste (physical, thermal, chemical or biological processes, including sorting to change waste characteristics) will be required to substantially reduce waste volume or hazardous nature of the waste, or to facilitate handling or to enhance the recovery potential of the waste. The LFD further requires that landfill gas will be used to generate non-fossil fuel derived energy wherever possible, that each site has a fully developed closure and aftercare plan and during the active phase and following closure, a monitoring regime to ensure groundwater quality is not compromised.

In addition to the above, landfill sites fall within the regulations drafted in response to the Groundwater Directive (agreed in 1979; published 1980 (80/68/EEC)) and which have been implemented through the Waste Management Licensing Regulations 1994 (Regulation 4) and the PPC Regime and Groundwater Regulations of 1998 (Hydrological Assessment Guidance 2003). This will be formally replaced by the Water Framework Directive in 2013 (or possibly earlier).

The objective of the Water Framework Directive (WFD) is to sustain surface water ecosystems and reverse recent trends in groundwater quality. In the context of landfill sites, groundwater protection measures require that there is no discharge of a prescribed range of substances (List I substances) to groundwater (saturated zone) and that formal compliance points below a landfill have been established.

== List I substances ==
- Organohalogen compounds (and substances which may form such compounds in the aquatic environment)
- Organophosphorus compounds
- Organotin compounds
- Mercury and its compounds
- Cadmium and its compounds
- Cyanides
- Substances which are carcinogenic, mutagenic or teratogenic in or via the aquatic environment
- Mineral oils and hydrocarbons

== List II substances ==
- The following metalloids and metals and their compounds: Zn (Zinc), Cu (Copper), Ni (Nickel), Cr (Chromium), Pb (Lead), Se (Selenium), As (Arsenic), Sb (Antimony), Mo (Molybdenum), Ti (Titanium), Sn (Tin), Ba (Barium), Be (Beryllium), B (Boron), U (Uranium), V (Vanadium), Co (Cobalt), Th (Thallium), Te (Tellurium), Ag (Silver).
- Biocides and their derivatives not appearing in List I
- Substances which have a deleterious effect on the taste and/or odour of groundwater
- Toxic or persistent organic compounds of silicon.
- Inorganic compounds of phosphorus and elemental phosphorus
- Fluorides
- Ammonia and nitrites

The prevention of these listed substances being discharged to the ground will ensure zero pollution. Direct discharges (no unsaturated zone) of List I substances must be prevented. Indirect discharges of List I substances (via the unsaturated zone) can only be authorized if prior investigation shows that there will be no discharge to groundwater.

Details of the current waste regulations together with information regarding EU directives and duty of care responsibilities can be found on the DETR web site: https://web.archive.org/web/20000823041655/http://www.environment.detr.gov.uk/waste/index.htm Details of the minimum monitoring procedures for landfills can be found at: http://www.grc.cf.ac.uk/lrn/resources/landfill/schedule3.php

== Notable landfills ==
- Avondale Landfill
- Brofiscin Quarry – one of two quarries that, discussed in Parliament led to the Deposit of Poisonous Waste Act 1972
- Calvert, Buckinghamshire
- Greengairs Landfill
- Maendy Quarry – one of two quarries that, discussed in Parliament led to the Deposit of Poisonous Waste Act 1972
- Mucking Marshes Landfill
- Pitsea waste management site
- Nantmel Landfill Site

== See also ==
- Animal By-Products Regulations
- Landfill Allowance Trading Scheme
- Landfill Directive – 1999 European Union directive
- Landfill tax – Tax levied on landfill operators to discourage landfill use
