= 3,4-dichloroaniline N-malonyltransferase =

Class of enzymes

Identifiers
- EC no.: 2.3.1.114
- CAS no.: 94489-99-3

Databases
- IntEnz: IntEnz view
- BRENDA: BRENDA entry
- ExPASy: NiceZyme view
- KEGG: KEGG entry
- MetaCyc: metabolic pathway
- PRIAM: profile
- PDB structures: RCSB PDB PDBe PDBsum
- Gene Ontology: AmiGO / QuickGO
Search
- PMC: articles
- PubMed: articles
- NCBI: proteins

3,4-dichloroaniline N-malonyltransferase (EC 2.3.1.114) is an enzyme that catalyzes the chemical reaction

3,4-Dichloroaniline
+
malonyl-CoA
N-(3,4-dichlorophenyl)malonamic acid
+ coenzyme A

The two substrates of this enzyme characterised from peanut are 3,4-dichloroaniline and malonyl-CoA. Its products are N-(3,4-dichlorophenyl)malonamic acid and coenzyme A.

This enzyme belongs to the family of transferases, specifically those acyltransferases transferring groups other than aminoacyl groups. The systematic name of this enzyme class is malonyl-CoA:3,4-dichloroaniline N-malonyltransferase.
