= Maendy =

Maendy and variant spellings of the word, is a common place name in Wales and in other countries where people of Welsh descent have settled. It may refer to:

- Maindee - a suburb of Newport
- Maindy - a suburb of Cardiff
- Maendy Quarry - a toxic waste land-fill
