= 1,3-Dichloro-2-nitrobenzene =

Names
- Preferred IUPAC name 1,3-Dichloro-2-nitrobenzene
- Other names m-Dichloronitrobenzene

Identifiers
| CAS Number | 601-88-7 |
| 3D model (JSmol) | Interactive image |
| ChemSpider | 11266 |
| ECHA InfoCard | 100.009.100 |
| PubChem CID | 11759 |
| RTECS number | CZ5255000 |
| UNII | J43L7QJM9M |
| UN number | 1578 |
| CompTox Dashboard (EPA) | DTXSID00208847 |
- InChI: InChI=1S/C6H3Cl2NO2/c7-4-2-1-3-5(8)6(4)9(10)11/h1-3H Key: VITSNECNFNNVQB-UHFFFAOYSA-N
- SMILES: C1=CC(=C(C(=C1)Cl)[N+](=O)[O-])Cl

Properties
| Chemical formula | C_{6}H_{3}Cl_{2}NO_{2} |
| Molar mass | 192.00 g·mol^{−1} |
| Appearance | Off-white solid |
| Density | 1.5 g/cm^{3} |
| Melting point | 69–70 °C (156–158 °F; 342–343 K) |

Hazards
- GHS labelling
| Pictograms | (GHS07: Exclamation mark) |
| Signal word | Warning |
| Hazard statements | H312, H412 |
| Precautionary statements | P273, P280, P302+P352, P312, P322, P363, P501 |
- Except where otherwise noted, data are given for materials in their standard state (at 25 °C [77 °F], 100 kPa). Infobox references

1,3-Dichloro-2-nitrobenzene is an organic compound with the formula C_{6}H_{3}Cl_{2}(NO_{2}). It is one of several isomeric dichloronitrobenzenes. It is an off-white solid that is soluble in conventional organic solvents.

The compound can be prepared by oxidation of 2,6-dichloroaniline using peroxytrifluoroacetic acid.
