= Pigment Yellow 10 =

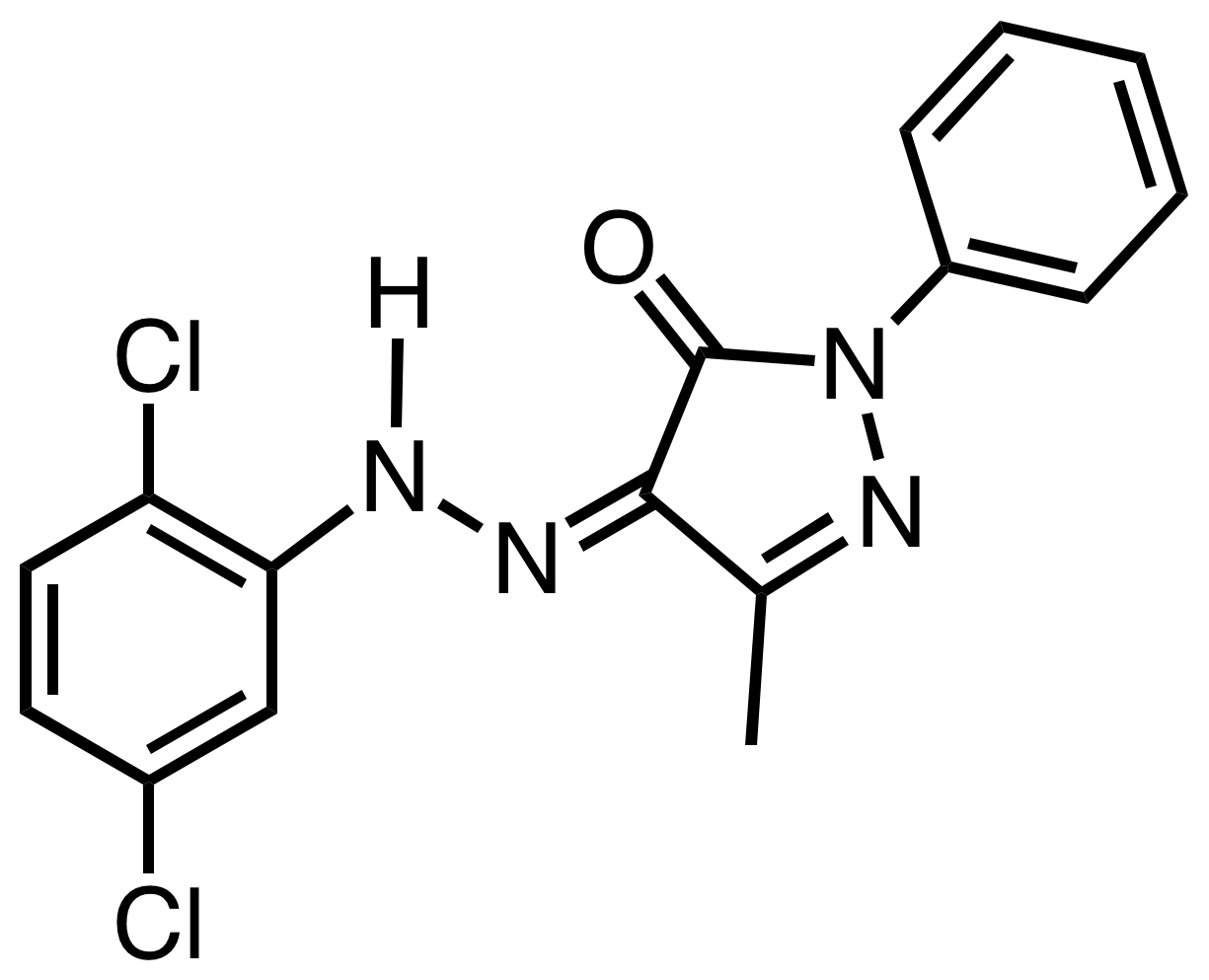

Names
- IUPAC name 4-[(2,5-dichlorophenyl)diazenyl]-5-methyl-2-phenyl-4H-pyrazol-3-one
- Other names Benzidine Yellow 10G, Sanyo Pigment Yellow 8105

Identifiers
CAS Number	6407-75-6
3D model (JSmol)	Interactive image
ChemSpider	21172416
ECHA InfoCard	100.026.401
PubChem CID	21118695
UNII	F4E9M94HBX
CompTox Dashboard (EPA)	DTXSID50884296
- InChI: InChI=1S/C16H12Cl2N4O/c1-10-15(20-19-14-9-11(17)7-8-13(14)18)16(23)22(21-10)12-5-3-2-4-6-12/h2-9,15H,1H3 Key: SYIDJAUAPDQFRN-UHFFFAOYSA-N
- SMILES: Clc1ccc(Cl)cc1N=Nc2c(C)nn(c2O)-c3ccccc3

Properties
Chemical formula	C_{16}H_{12}Cl_{2}N_{4}O
Molar mass	347.20 g·mol^{−1}
Appearance	Yellow solid
- Except where otherwise noted, data are given for materials in their standard state (at 25 °C [77 °F], 100 kPa). Infobox references

Pigment Yellow 10 is an organic compound that is classified as a monoazopyrazolone pigment. It is used as a yellow colorant, notably as yellow road marking on highways in the US.

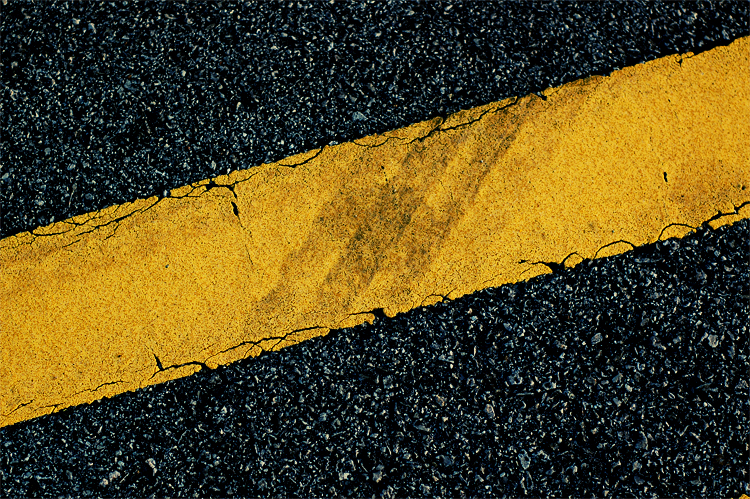
Pigment Yellow 10 is commonly used for yellow road markings

The compound is synthesized by coupling the diazonium salt derived from dichloroaniline with the pyrazolone. The structure of the dye, as determined by X-ray crystallography, consists of planar molecule with a C=O bond and two hydrazone groups.
