= 3,5-Dichloroaniline =

Names
- Preferred IUPAC name 3,5-Dichloroaniline
- Other names 1-amino-3,5- dichlorobenzene

Identifiers
CAS Number	626-43-7
3D model (JSmol)	Interactive image
Beilstein Reference	636492
ChEBI	CHEBI:19904
ChEMBL	ChEMBL1451208
ChemSpider	11778
ECHA InfoCard	100.009.954
EC Number	210-948-9
Gmelin Reference	363409
PubChem CID	12281
UNII	OZ75ZM1S3G
CompTox Dashboard (EPA)	DTXSID7030307
- InChI: InChI=1S/C6H5Cl2N/c7-4-1-5(8)3-6(9)2-4/h1-3H,9H2 Key: UQRLKWGPEVNVHT-UHFFFAOYSA-N
- SMILES: C1=C(C=C(C=C1Cl)Cl)N

Properties
Chemical formula	C_{6}H_{5}Cl_{2}N
Molar mass	162.01 g·mol^{−1}
Appearance	colorless solid
Density	1.58 g/cm^{3}
Melting point	51–53 °C (124–127 °F; 324–326 K)
Boiling point	260 °C (500 °F; 533 K) 741 torr

Hazards
- GHS labelling
Pictograms	(GHS06: Toxic) (GHS08: Health hazard) (GHS09: Environmental hazard)
Signal word	Danger
Hazard statements	H301, H311, H331, H373, H410
Precautionary statements	P260, P262, P264, P270, P271, P273, P280, P301+P316, P302+P352, P304+P340, P316, P319, P321, P330, P361+P364, P391, P403+P233, P405, P501
- Except where otherwise noted, data are given for materials in their standard state (at 25 °C [77 °F], 100 kPa). Infobox references

3,5-Dichloroaniline is an organic compound with the formula C_{6}H_{3}Cl_{2}(NH_{2}). It is one of several isomers of dichloroaniline. It is a colorless solid although commercial samples often appear colored. It is produced by hydrogenation of 3,5-dichloronitrobenzene. It is a precursor to the fungicide vinclozolin.

== Safety and environmental aspects ==
Its 72-h EC_{50} in an algal growth inhibition assay is 4.39 mg/L. Biodegradation of dichloroanilines usually proceeds via initial ring hydroxylation.
