= Dichloronitrobenzene =

Dichloronitrobenzene can refer to any of the following isomers of C_{6}H_{3}Cl_{2}(NO_{2}):

- 1,2-Dichloro-3-nitrobenzene
- 1,2-Dichloro-4-nitrobenzene
- 1,3-Dichloro-2-nitrobenzene
- 1,3-Dichloro-4-nitrobenzene
- 1,3-Dichloro-5-nitrobenzene
- 1,4-Dichloro-2-nitrobenzene
