= Propanil =

Weed control herbicide

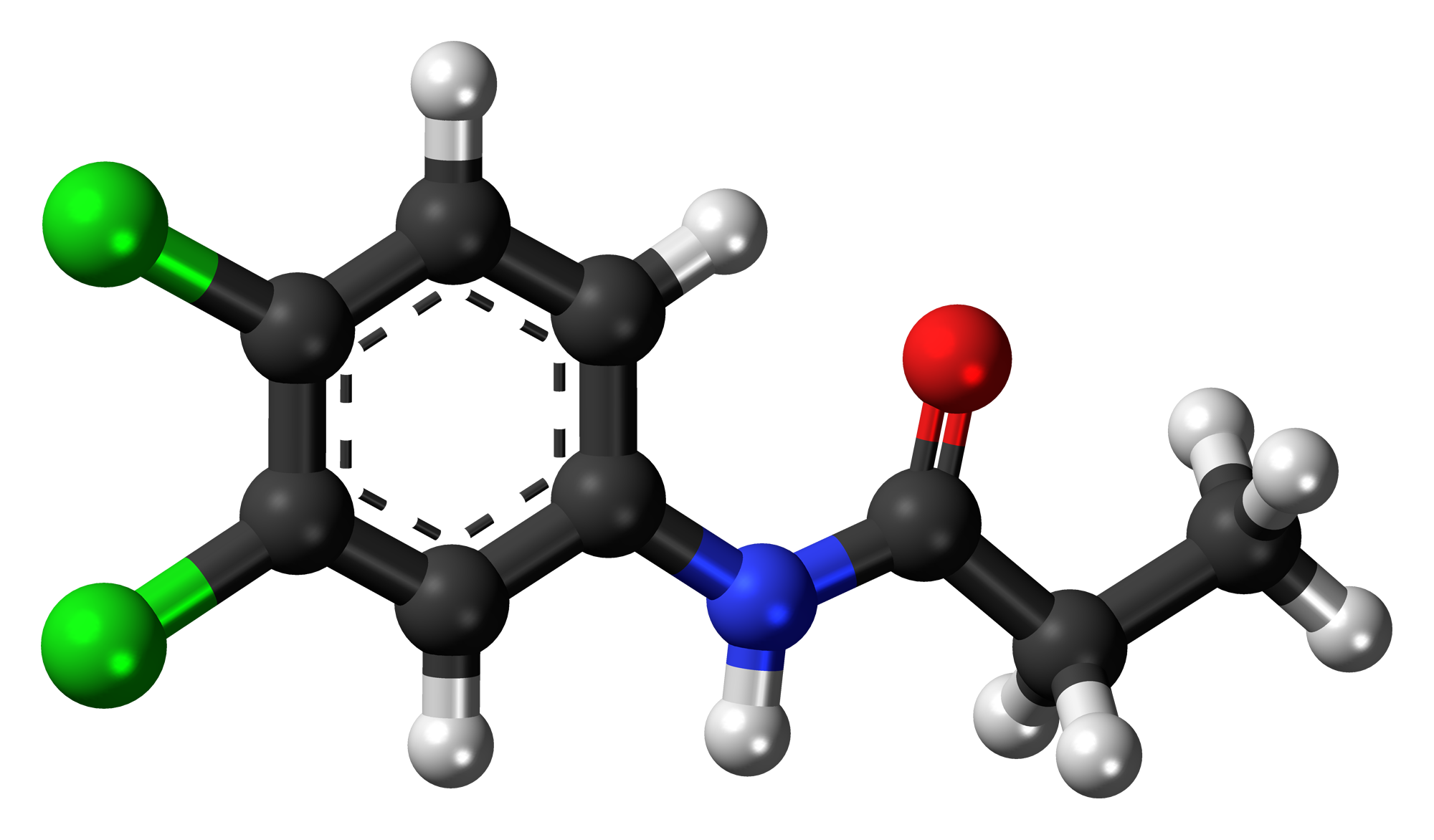

Names
- Preferred IUPAC name N-(3,4-Dichlorophenyl)propanamide
- Other names: propanamide; DCPA; 3,4-DCPA; N-(3,4-Dichlorophenyl)propionamide

Identifiers
CAS Number	709-98-8
3D model (JSmol)	Interactive image
ChEBI	CHEBI:34936
ChEMBL	ChEMBL1222498
ChemSpider	4764
ECHA InfoCard	100.010.832
KEGG	C14229
PubChem CID	4933
UNII	F57I4G0520
CompTox Dashboard (EPA)	DTXSID8022111
- InChI: InChI=1S/C9H9Cl2NO/c1-2-9(13)12-6-3-4-7(10)8(11)5-6/h3-5H,2H2,1H3,(H,12,13) Key: LFULEKSKNZEWOE-UHFFFAOYSA-N; InChI=1/C9H9Cl2NO/c1-2-9(13)12-6-3-4-7(10)8(11)5-6/h3-5H,2H2,1H3,(H,12,13) Key: LFULEKSKNZEWOE-UHFFFAOYAI
- SMILES: Clc1ccc(NC(=O)CC)cc1Cl

Properties
Chemical formula	C_{9}H_{9}Cl_{2}NO
Molar mass	218.08 g/mol
Appearance	White crystalline solid (pure), Brown powder (impure)
Melting point	91 to 93 °C (196 to 199 °F; 364 to 366 K)
Solubility in water	225 ppm

Hazards
- Lethal dose or concentration (LD, LC)
LD_{50} (median dose)	1384 mg/kg (rat, oral)
- Except where otherwise noted, data are given for materials in their standard state (at 25 °C [77 °F], 100 kPa). verify (what is ?) Infobox references

Propanil is a widely used contact herbicide. With an estimated use of about 8 million pounds in 2001, it is one of the more widely used herbicides in the United States. Propanil is said to be in use in approximately 400,000 acres of rice production each year. Propanil was introduced in 1960. It is also used in Australia,, India and Uganda.

== Mode of action ==
The principal mode of propanil's herbicidal action against weeds is inhibition of their photosynthesis and CO_{2} fixation. Plants photosynthesize in two stages. In stage I photosynthetic reactions capture sunlight energy and yield molecules with high energy content. In stage II these molecules react to capture CO_{2}, yielding carbohydrate precursors. In the stage I reaction a chlorophyll molecule absorbs one photon (light) and loses one electron, starting an electron transport chain reaction leading to the stage II reactions. Propanil inhibits the electron transport chain reaction and its conversion of CO_{2} to carbohydrate precursors. That inhibits further development of the weed.

Rice is relatively immune to propanil but most weeds are susceptible to it. The reason for the selectivity is that rice contains a high level of the enzyme aryl acylamidase (AAA), which rapidly metabolizes propanil to relatively nontoxic 3,4-dichloroaniline. Susceptible weeds lack the gene(s) coding for the AAA enzyme and thus succumb to propanil. However, intensive use of propanil and natural selection have caused some weeds to become resistant to propanil.

Propanil's MoA makes its HRAC Group C (Australia), Group C2 (global) or Group 7 (numeric). Due to 5 and 7 merging, it is also a Group 5.

== Synthesis ==
Propanil is made industrially by nitration of 1,2-dichlorobenzene (1) to give 1,2-dichloro-4-nitrobenzene (2), followed by hydrogenation of the nitro group with Raney nickel to give 3,4-dichloroaniline (3). Acylation of the amine with propanoyl chloride yields propanil (4). The resulting product is white or brown crystals.

== Patent litigation ==
Propanil was the subject of several patent infringement suits. In one, Monsanto Co. v. Rohm and Haas Co., the United States Court of Appeals for the Third Circuit held that Monsanto committed fraud on the Patent Office in procuring its patent on propanil.

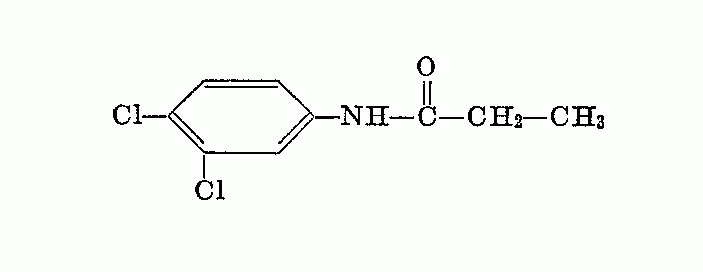
Another 3,4-DCPA structural diagram showing (at far right) chemical groups involved in fraud controversy

Monsanto obtained the patent by providing data to the Patent Office showing that propanil "had "unusual and valuable herbicidal activity" and that its activity was "surprising" because "related compounds possess little or no herbicidal efficiency." Monsanto had conducted a number of tests and submitted test data to the Patent Office that indicated that propanil was superior to other similar chemicals, including one chemical that differed from propanil only in eliminating the CH_{2} group to the left of the CH_{3} group at the far right of the diagram shown at above right. (The two chemicals are so-called adjacent homologues.)

But Monsanto had withheld data on those tests that showed that other similar compounds also had herbicidal activity similar to that of propanil. The court said that this amounted to a misrepresentation and Monsanto was not entitled to a patent, so that the patent was invalid or unenforceable. In an earlier case, however, a judge had accepted Monsanto's argument that Monsanto "did nothing more than put their best foot forward" with the Patent Office.
