= 2,4-Dichloroaniline =

Names
- Preferred IUPAC name 2,4-Dichloroaniline

Identifiers
CAS Number	554-00-7
3D model (JSmol)	Interactive image
Beilstein Reference	386422
ChEBI	CHEBI:46635
ChEMBL	ChEMBL1528820
ChemSpider	13860817
ECHA InfoCard	100.008.235
EC Number	209-057-8
Gmelin Reference	201203
KEGG	C14419
PubChem CID	11123
UNII	19AE42M6WS
UN number	3442 1590
CompTox Dashboard (EPA)	DTXSID1024966
- InChI: InChI=1S/C6H5Cl2N/c7-4-1-2-6(9)5(8)3-4/h1-3H,9H2 Key: KQCMTOWTPBNWDB-UHFFFAOYSA-N
- SMILES: ClC1=C(N)C=CC(Cl)=C1

Properties
Chemical formula	C_{6}H_{5}Cl_{2}N
Molar mass	162.01 g·mol^{−1}
Density	1.567
Melting point	59–62 °C (138–144 °F; 332–335 K)
Boiling point	245 °C (473 °F; 518 K)
log P	2.91

Hazards
- GHS labelling
Pictograms	(GHS05: Corrosive) (GHS06: Toxic) (GHS07: Exclamation mark) (GHS08: Health hazard) (GHS09: Environmental hazard)
Signal word	Danger
Hazard statements	H301, H311, H317, H318, H331, H373, H410
Precautionary statements	P260, P262, P264, P264+P265, P270, P271, P272, P273, P280, P301+P316, P302+P352, P304+P340, P305+P354+P338, P316, P317, P319, P321, P330, P333+P317, P361+P364, P362+P364, P391, P403+P233, P405, P501
Flash point	115 °C (239 °F; 388 K)
- Except where otherwise noted, data are given for materials in their standard state (at 25 °C [77 °F], 100 kPa). Infobox references

2,4-Dichloroaniline is an organic compound with the formula C_{6}H_{3}Cl_{2}NH_{2}. It is one of six isomers of dichloroaniline, a chlorinated variant of aniline. It appears as beige crystals.
