= 2,5-Dichloroaniline =

Names
- Preferred IUPAC name 2,5-Dichloroaniline

Identifiers
CAS Number	95-82-9
3D model (JSmol)	Interactive image
ChemSpider	13869655
ECHA InfoCard	100.002.233
PubChem CID	7262
UNII	7U61VY7POL
CompTox Dashboard (EPA)	DTXSID6024967
- InChI: InChI=1S/C6H5Cl2N/c7-4-1-2-5(8)6(9)3-4/h1-3H,9H2 Key: AVYGCQXNNJPXSS-UHFFFAOYSA-N; InChI=1/C6H5Cl2N/c7-4-1-2-5(8)6(9)3-4/h1-3H,9H2 Key: AVYGCQXNNJPXSS-UHFFFAOYAK
- SMILES: C1=CC(=C(C=C1Cl)N)Cl

Properties
Chemical formula	C_{6}H_{5}Cl_{2}N
Molar mass	162.01 g·mol^{−1}
Melting point	47 to 50 °C (117 to 122 °F; 320 to 323 K)
Boiling point	251 °C (484 °F; 524 K)
- Except where otherwise noted, data are given for materials in their standard state (at 25 °C [77 °F], 100 kPa). Infobox references

2,5-Dichloroaniline is an organic compound with the formula C_{6}H_{3}Cl_{2}NH_{2}. One of six isomers of dichloroaniline, it is a colorless solid that is insoluble in water. It is produced by hydrogenation of 1,4-dichloro-2-nitrobenzene. It is a precursor to dyes and pigments, e.g., Pigment Yellow 10.

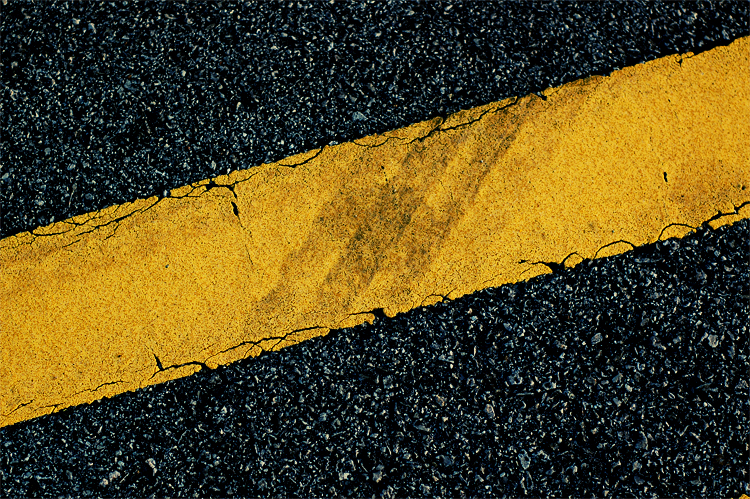
Pigment Yellow 10, a derivative of 2,5-dichloroanilne, is commonly used for yellow road markings in the US.
