= Asgrow =

American seed company

- Industry: Seed company
- Founded: 1927; 99 years ago
- Fate: Brand of Bayer AG
- Headquarters: Creve Coeur, MO, United States
- Products: soybean
- Website: www.dekalbasgrowdeltapine.com/en-us/asgrow.html

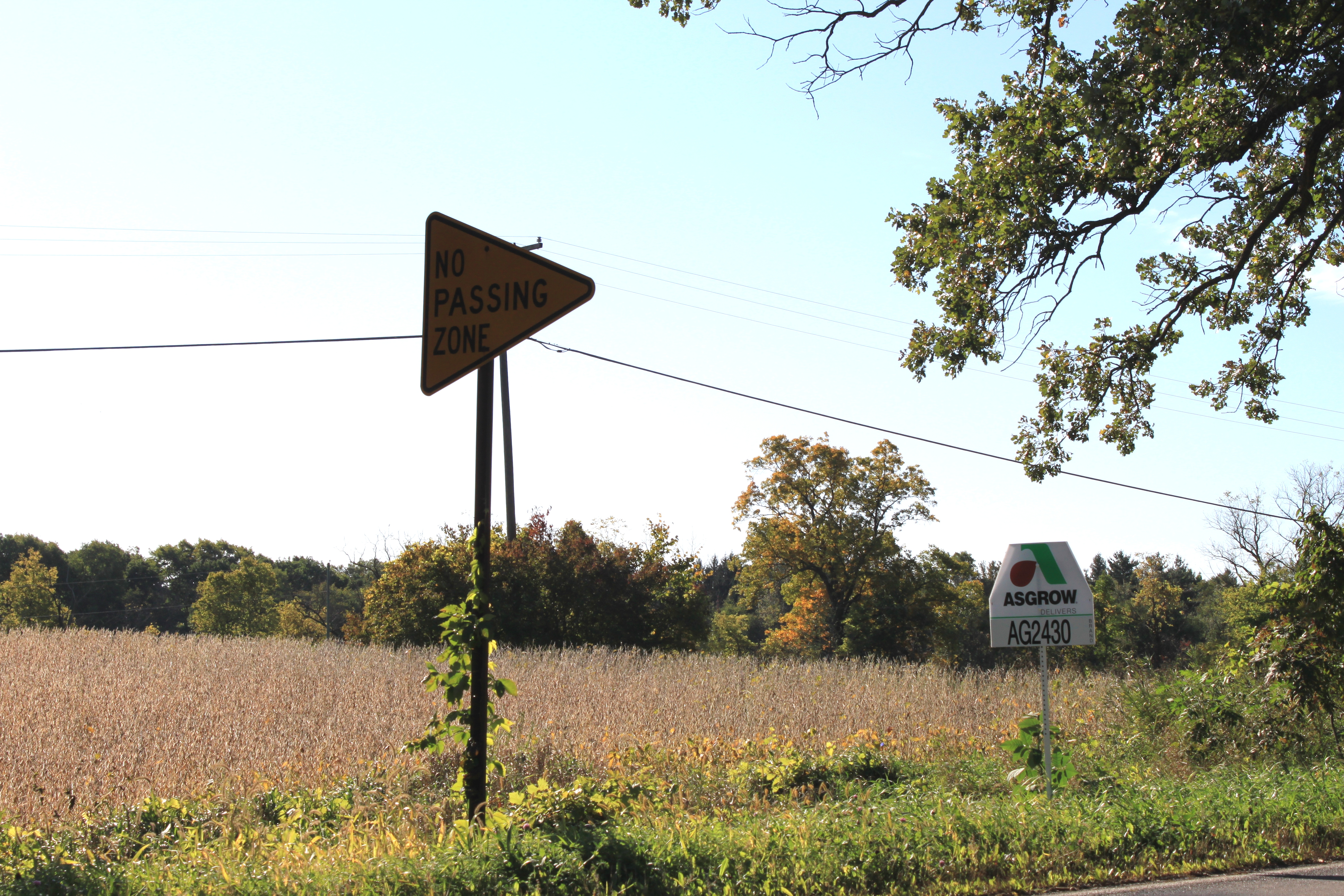
Soybean field planted with Asgrow AG2430 seed, Saline Township, Michigan

Asgrow is a seed company owned and operated by Bayer Crop Science.

== History ==
The Associated Seed Growers, Inc. ("Asgrow") was formed in 1927 when seed competitors Everett B. Clark Seed Co., John H. Allen Seed Co., and N.B. Keeney & Son joined together. The company's headquarters were located in New Haven, Connecticut. In 1958, the company formally changed their name to Asgrow Seed Company. The Upjohn Company acquired Asgrow in 1968 in a stock swap. In 1994, Mexico-based company, Empresas La Moderna SA purchased Asgrow for $300 million. At the time, Asgrow was the fifth-largest seed company with $270 million in sales. Monsanto purchased Asgrow from Empresas in 1996 for $240 million. In 1997, the company moved its headquarters to the Des Moines area from Kalamazoo, Michigan.

In 1996, Asgrow released the first Roundup Ready Soybean to the market building upon Monsanto's work to create petunia plants tolerant to small amounts of Roundup developed by Robert Fraley in 1985. The first season of sales saw over 1 million acres using the new seed and quickly over 80% of US soybeans were produced with the seed.

In 2012, Asgrow started its National Yield Contest for soybean producers. The contest winner produces the most soybeans and farmers nationwide have opportunity to learn more about the latest seed technologies and production practices.

In 2018, Bayer AG acquired Monsanto, and Asgrow became a brand of Bayer Crop Science.

== Products ==
Asgrow seeds feature many Monsanto technologies including RoundUp-Ready 2 Yield. Asgrow sold sunflower, corn, alfalfa, spring canola, and winter canola. Now the brand solely consists of soybean varieties with various yield protection technologies from Monsanto and third parties (such as BASF) in conjunction with Dekalb. Monsanto, had been accused of causing Asgrow to breach two soybean research and development agreements with DuPont and the termination of another collaborative R&D agreement with AgrEvo to hinder the development of competing herbicide tolerant seed trait.
