= 2,3-Dichloroaniline =

Names
- Preferred IUPAC name 2,3-Dichloroaniline
- Other names 1-amino-2,3-dichlorobenzene

Identifiers
CAS Number	608-27-5
3D model (JSmol)	Interactive image
ChEBI	CHEBI:46636
ChEMBL	ChEMBL1889723
ChemSpider	21111810
ECHA InfoCard	100.009.235
EC Number	210-157-9
Gmelin Reference	601687
PubChem CID	11844
UNII	2BL4F1DXVN
UN number	3442 1590
CompTox Dashboard (EPA)	DTXSID8040696
- InChI: InChI=1S/C6H5Cl2N/c7-4-2-1-3-5(9)6(4)8/h1-3H,9H2 Key: BRPSAOUFIJSKOT-UHFFFAOYSA-N
- SMILES: C1=CC(=C(C(=C1)Cl)Cl)N

Properties
Chemical formula	C_{6}H_{5}Cl_{2}N
Molar mass	162.01 g·mol^{−1}
Appearance	colorless oil
Density	1.383 g/cm^{3}
Melting point	24 °C (75 °F; 297 K)
Boiling point	252 °C (486 °F; 525 K)
log P	2.78
Refractive index (n_{D})	1.5969

Hazards
- GHS labelling
Pictograms	(GHS06: Toxic) (GHS07: Exclamation mark) (GHS08: Health hazard) (GHS09: Environmental hazard)
Signal word	Danger
Hazard statements	H301, H311, H315, H317, H331, H373, H410
Precautionary statements	P260, P262, P264, P270, P271, P272, P273, P280, P301+P316, P302+P352, P304+P340, P316, P319, P321, P330, P333+P317, P361+P364, P362+P364, P391, P403+P233, P405, P501
- Except where otherwise noted, data are given for materials in their standard state (at 25 °C [77 °F], 100 kPa). Infobox references

2,3-Dichloroaniline is an organic compound with the formula C_{6}H_{3}Cl_{2}(NH_{2}). It is one of several isomers of dichloroaniline. It is a colorless oil although commercial samples often appear colored. It is produced by hydrogenation of 2,3-dichloronitrobenzene.

== Safety and environmental aspects ==
Its 72-h EC50 is 6.75 mg/L. Biodegradation of 2,3-dichloroaniline proceeds via initial ring hydroxylation.
