= Dichloroaniline =

Dichloroanilines are chemical compounds which consist of an aniline ring substituted with two chlorine atoms and have the molecular formula C_{6}H_{5}Cl_{2}N. There are six isomers, varying in the positions of the chlorine atoms around the ring relative to the amino group. As aniline derivatives, they are named with the amino group in position 1. They are all colorless, although commercial samples can appear colored due to the presence of impurities. Several derivatives are used in the production of dyes and herbicides.

Dichloroaniline isomers
Compound name	CAS#	Chemical structure	Melting point
2,3-Dichloroaniline	608-27-5		20–25 °C (68–77 °F)
2,4-Dichloroaniline	554-00-7		59–62 °C (138–144 °F)
2,5-Dichloroaniline	95-82-9		47–50 °C (117–122 °F)
2,6-Dichloroaniline	608-31-1		36–38 °C (97–100 °F)
3,4-Dichloroaniline	95-76-1		69–71 °C (156–160 °F)
3,5-Dichloroaniline	626-43-7		46–52 °C (115–126 °F)
