= Kemner v. Monsanto =

1985–87 toxic tort lawsuit

Kemner v. Monsanto was a landmark toxic tort lawsuit brought against the Monsanto Company in the wake of a 1979 train derailment in Sturgeon, Missouri. The case involved claims by local residents who alleged that they had been exposed to toxic dioxin released during the derailment and suffered adverse health effects. It became one of the longest civil trials in Illinois history and is significant for its role in shaping toxic tort law and environmental litigation.

== Background ==
On January 10, 1979, a freight train derailed in the small town of Sturgeon, Missouri. Among the derailed cars was one carrying 2,4,5-trichlorophenol, a chemical used in the manufacture of herbicides such as Agent Orange. During the derailment, the chemical spilled and released dioxin, a highly toxic compound linked to serious health problems in animals and potentially in humans.

Residents living near the derailment site reported a range of health concerns in the months and years following the incident. Symptoms included skin rashes, headaches, fatigue, and fears of long-term illnesses such as cancer and reproductive harm. Concerns over the chemical’s potential impact, combined with allegations of corporate negligence, eventually led a group of plaintiffs to pursue legal action against Monsanto.

== Legal proceedings ==
In the early 1980s, 17 plaintiffs filed suit against Monsanto, alleging that exposure to dioxin caused their medical conditions and that the company was liable for failing to warn the public about the dangers of the chemical. The legal claims included negligence, strict liability, and willful and wanton misconduct.

Monsanto denied the allegations, disputing both the toxicity of the low-level exposure and its responsibility for the incident. The company argued that scientific evidence did not support the plaintiffs’ claims and that the levels of dioxin present were too low to cause harm.

The trial began in St. Clair County, Illinois, in 1985 and lasted nearly 11 months, making it one of the longest jury trials in the state’s history at the time. Proceedings featured extensive expert testimony, prolonged scientific debate, and close examination of environmental safety standards.

== Decision ==
In 1987, the jury returned a verdict in favor of Monsanto, finding that the plaintiffs had not proven that their injuries were caused by exposure to dioxin. The court concluded that while the plaintiffs may have experienced health issues, the evidence presented at trial did not establish a direct causal link to Monsanto’s chemical.

The verdict was upheld on appeal by the Illinois Appellate Court. The appellate decision highlighted the difficulty plaintiffs face in proving causation in toxic tort cases, particularly where low-level chemical exposures are concerned.

== Public reaction ==
The trial drew significant media coverage, both locally and nationally. Time magazine published a feature on the case, noting its extraordinary length and the community’s concern over chemical safety.

Reactions in Sturgeon were mixed. Some residents accepted the jury’s verdict, while others felt the legal system had failed to hold a major corporation accountable for potential health risks. The case intensified local concerns about environmental hazards and transparency in corporate practices.

== Significance ==
Kemner v. Monsanto has been cited in discussions of toxic tort litigation as an example of the evidentiary challenges in proving harm from environmental exposures. The case underscored the importance of scientific evidence in environmental lawsuits and revealed the limitations of the court system in addressing community-wide environmental concerns.

Socially, the trial contributed to broader public awareness of corporate responsibility in environmental safety and fueled debate about the adequacy of regulations governing hazardous materials. It remains a reference point in environmental law, public health policy, and academic discussions about toxic torts.
