= Paul François =

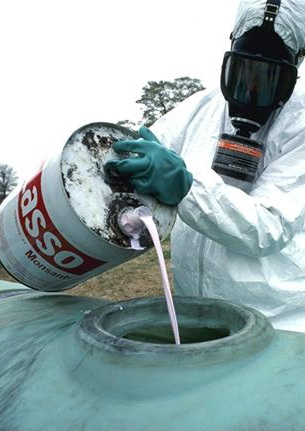
The Monsanto product with which François was poisoned is known commercially as Lasso

Paul François is a French agricultor and author, who has been decorated with the Legion of Honour. He is notable chiefly because he demonstrated to a court of law that he was poisoned by a Monsanto product, a formulation of "Lasso" herbicide with the active ingredient Alachlor.

== Early life ==
François is a native of Bernac, Charente.

He chose to specialise in cereal agriculture from an early age.

François considers himself to have been "a pure product of the chemical agriculture industry", up until his rupture with it because of his poisoning.

== Toxic incident ==
EU standard toxic symbol, as defined by Directive 67/548/EEC

François inhaled the poison on 27 April 2004. He was ill enough to spit blood when interned in hospital. As late as November that year, the long-term effects of the poison caused him to faint, and in May 2005 it was determined that monochlorobenzene—a solvent used in Lasso to dilute the Alachlor—was present in his bloodstream.

Betimes, Alachlor was prohibited by the French government in November 2007.

== Formal recognition of hazard ==
An employment tribunal formally recognised in 2010 that François in fact had been poisoned.

== François v Monsanto ==
=== Trial court ===
The Monsanto product with which François was poisoned is known commercially as Lasso.

In December 2011, final arguments to the court were heard.

In February 2012, the Tribunal de Grande Instance of Lyon condemned Monsanto to pay damages to François.

=== Appeal court ===
In 2015 at the appeal court, Monsanto lawyers repeatedly refused to concede that their product was toxic and that the damages owed were fictitious.

In second appeal on 11 April 2019, the court found Monsanto guilty of the damage endured by Paul François, finding that the firm, being aware of Lasso’s dangers, should have clearly indicated on Lasso’s labelling and instructions for use “a notice on the specific dangers of using the product in vats and reservoirs”.

=== Court of cassation ===
The case was finally set against Monsanto on 21 October 2020 by the Court of Cassation (French highest appeal court), which rejected Monsanto’s bid to overturn the 2019 sentence.

In a ruling handed down on 7 November 2022, the Lyon judicial court sentenced the German agrochemical giant Bayer (which bought Monsanto in 2018) to pay Paul François the sum of €11,135.

== Author ==
François wrote, with Anne-Laure Barret, Un paysan contre Monsanto to document his battle against Monsanto. This book, which was released to market in October 2017, was published by Fayard press.
