= Maendy Quarry =

Landfill site near Cardiff, Wales

Coordinates: 51.580760°N 3.339243°W

Maendy Quarry is an abandoned stone quarry near Cardiff in South Wales that was subsequently used in the 1960s as a landfill site for industrial waste.

The site became infamous in the early 1970s when it became clear that toxic industrial waste had been deposited at the site, which included PCBs from Monsanto Newport factory now owned by Eastman. In addition, local farmers had been paid compensation for the death of animals that had been grazing near the site. The company using this disposal site also used the nearby Brofiscin Quarry. The Brofiscin site is the main touchpoint when discussing the pollutants that ended up in these quarries.

The site which is on the watershed between the River Ely and River Taff continues to produce a polluting leachate and requests to the local authority to provide information about the material contained in the site have been refused.

== See also ==
- Monsanto legal cases#Brofiscin Quarry
