= 2,6-Dichloroaniline =

Names
- Preferred IUPAC name 2,6-Dichloroaniline

Identifiers
CAS Number	608-31-1
3D model (JSmol)	Interactive image
ChEMBL	ChEMBL28368
ChemSpider	11353
ECHA InfoCard	100.009.237
EC Number	210-160-5
PubChem CID	11846
UNII	KG3RW7NW6M
UN number	1590
CompTox Dashboard (EPA)	DTXSID5044449
- InChI: InChI=1S/C6H5Cl2N/c7-4-2-1-3-5(8)6(4)9/h1-3H,9H2 Key: JDMFXJULNGEPOI-UHFFFAOYSA-N
- SMILES: C1=CC(=C(C(=C1)Cl)N)Cl

Properties
Chemical formula	C_{6}H_{5}Cl_{2}N
Molar mass	162.01 g·mol^{−1}
Appearance	white solid
Melting point	39 °C (102 °F; 312 K)

Hazards
- GHS labelling
Pictograms	(GHS06: Toxic) (GHS07: Exclamation mark) (GHS08: Health hazard) (GHS09: Environmental hazard)
Signal word	Danger
Hazard statements	H301, H311, H317, H331, H373, H410
Precautionary statements	P260, P264, P270, P271, P272, P273, P280, P301+P310, P302+P352, P304+P340, P311, P312, P314, P321, P322, P330, P333+P313, P361, P363, P391, P403+P233, P405, P501
- Except where otherwise noted, data are given for materials in their standard state (at 25 °C [77 °F], 100 kPa). Infobox references

2,6-Dichloroaniline is an organic compound with the formula C_{6}H_{3}Cl_{2}(NH_{2}). It is one of several isomers of dichloroaniline. It is a colorless or white solid. Derivatives include the drugs clonidine and diclofenac.

== Preparation ==
It is produced by hydrogenation of 2,6-dichloronitrobenzene.

In the laboratory, it can be prepared by halogenation of sulfanilamide followed by desulfonation.
