= Brofiscin Quarry =

Limestone quarry in South Wales

Coordinates: 51°31′20″N 3°20′35″W

Brofiscin Quarry is a disused limestone quarry in Groes-faen, near Llantrisant in South Wales. It was used for about seven years for the dumping of toxic waste including polychlorinated biphenyls (PCBs) and was capped in 2011. Some 72,000m^{3} / 80,000 tonnes of material was dumped here. Prior to its remediation, The Guardian described the site as "one of the most contaminated places in Britain." The level of pollution is such that it featured in an international conference discussing remediation of contaminated land. These events were described by The Ecologist magazine as "one of the biggest environmental crimes to have occurred in the UK". and the key witness at an Environmental Agency inquiry on 2006 ended up needing to live under police protection. The company using this disposal site also used the nearby Maendy Quarry.

== Pollution ==
Brofiscin Quarry is privately owned and was leased to waste contractors for use as a landfill, as is common with spent quarries. It was used as a waste site from about 1965 to 1972 and accepted waste from BP, Veolia, and Monsanto. A 2005 report by Environmental Agency Wales found that the quarry contained up to 75 toxic substances, including heavy metals, Agent Orange, and polychlorinated biphenyls (PCBs). Prior to its remediation, The Guardian described the site as "one of the most contaminated places in Britain."

The legislative frameworks prior to 1972 were not designed to deal with hazardous waste and were inadequate. This meant that the local planning department was ill-equipped when a request for planning permission was made in the late 1960s and consent was given. The Poisonous Waste Act 1972 was implemented due to other far smaller occurrences of dumping at other places in the UK.

== Remediation and costs ==
In February 2011 The Ecologist and The Guardian reported that Monsanto had agreed to help with the costs of remediation, but did not accept responsibility for the pollution. A webpage at the Environmental Agency site put up at around that time states:

"We have completed our extensive enquiries to identify those we consider should be held responsible under the contaminated land laws and be held liable for the cost of remediating Brofiscin Quarry. We are at an advanced stage in our consultations with BP, Veolia and Monsanto to provide them with the opportunity to help remediate the land on a voluntary basis. We expect to make further progress on this matter in the next few months. If this approach is unsuccessful, we have the power to carry out the work needed ourselves and recover our costs. The three companies have been identified under the legislation as inheriting the liabilities of companies who were associated with depositing wastes at the quarry."

In 2011 Environment Agency Wales and the Rhondda Cynon Taf council announced that they had decided to place an engineered cap over the waste mass in the quarry and stated that the cost would be £1.5 million; previous estimates discussed in the media had been as high as £100 million, which Environment Agency Wales had dismissed. The site was cleared of vegetation and engineering work began in October 2011, and was completed in 2012.

On 14 July 2015, it was reported that Monsanto, BP, and Veolia had agreed to pay to contribute to the cleanup of the site, although they continue to deny liability.

The clean-up is an incomplete containment, with a chemical smell still evident in boundary ditches and strong concerns remaining about neighbouring fields.

== Geology ==
It has been designated a Site of Special Scientific Interest due to the exposed Early Carboniferous geological formations on the site.

== See also ==
- List of Sites of Special Scientific Interest in Mid & South Glamorgan
