= 1,4-Dichloro-2-nitrobenzene =

Names
- Preferred IUPAC name 1,4-Dichloro-2-nitrobenzene
- Other names Nitro-P-dichlorobenzene

Identifiers
CAS Number	89-61-2
3D model (JSmol)	Interactive image
ChEMBL	ChEMBL354761
ChemSpider	21111865
ECHA InfoCard	100.001.749
MeSH	C503932
PubChem CID	6977
RTECS number	CZ5260000
UNII	IY18G50FF4
UN number	1578
CompTox Dashboard (EPA)	DTXSID7052602
- InChI: InChI=1S/C6H3Cl2NO2/c7-4-1-2-5(8)6(3-4)9(10)11/h1-3H Key: RZKKOBGFCAHLCZ-UHFFFAOYSA-N
- SMILES: c1cc(c(cc1Cl)[N+](=O)[O-])Cl

Properties
Chemical formula	C_{6}H_{3}Cl_{2}NO_{2}
Molar mass	192.00
Appearance	yellow flakes
Density	1.67
Melting point	52–54 °C (126–129 °F; 325–327 K)
Boiling point	266–269 °C (511–516 °F; 539–542 K)
Solubility in water	95 mg/L

Hazards
- GHS labelling
Pictograms	(GHS07: Exclamation mark) (GHS08: Health hazard) (GHS09: Environmental hazard)
Signal word	Danger
Hazard statements	H302, H336, H351, H361, H370, H372, H373, H410
Precautionary statements	P201, P202, P260, P264, P270, P271, P273, P281, P301+P312, P304+P340, P307+P311, P308+P313, P312, P314, P321, P330, P391, P403+P233, P405, P501
Flash point	135 °C (275 °F; 408 K)
Autoignition temperature	465 °C (869 °F; 738 K)
- Except where otherwise noted, data are given for materials in their standard state (at 25 °C [77 °F], 100 kPa). Infobox references

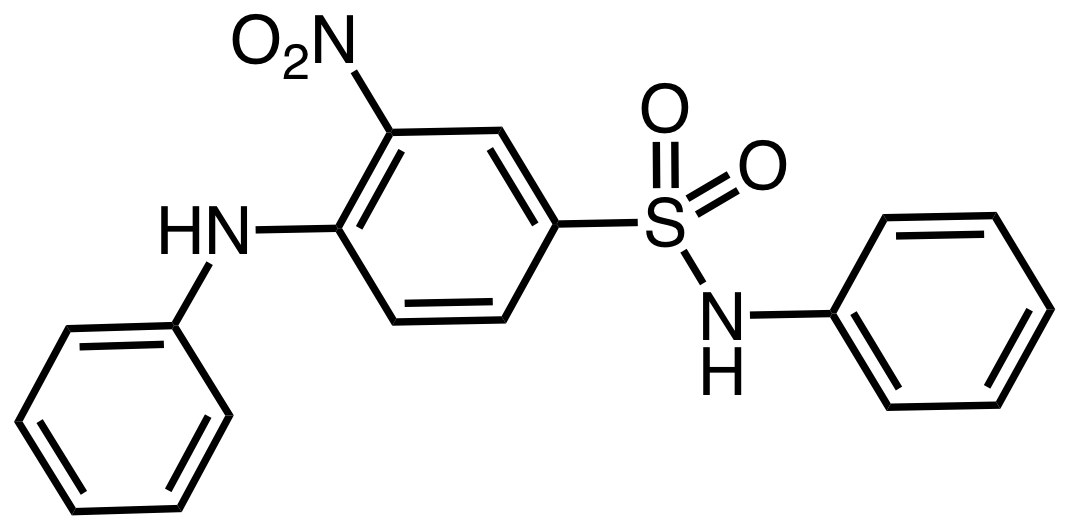
Disperse Yellow 42, a popular dye for polyesters, is derived from 1,4-dichloro-2-nitrobenzene.

1,4-Dichloro-2-nitrobenzene is an organic compound with the formula C_{6}H_{3}Cl_{2}NO_{2}. One of several isomers of dichloronitrobenzene, it is a yellow solid that is insoluble in water. It is produced by nitration of 1,4-dichlorobenzene. It is a precursor to many derivatives of commercial interest. Hydrogenation gives 1,4-dichloroaniline. Nucleophiles displace the chloride adjacent to the nitro group: ammonia gives the aniline derivative, aqueous base gives the phenol derivative, and methoxide gives the anisole derivative. These compounds are respectively 4-chloro-2-nitroaniline, 4-chloro-2-nitrophenol, and 4-chloro-2-nitroanisole.
