= 3,4-Dichloroaniline =

Names
- Preferred IUPAC name 3,4-Dichloroaniline
- Other names 1-amino-3,4-dichlorobenzene

Identifiers
CAS Number	95-76-1
ChEBI	CHEBI:16767
ChEMBL	ChEMBL1319813
ChemSpider	13860720
ECHA InfoCard	100.002.227
EC Number	202-448-4
Gmelin Reference	602350
KEGG	C02791
PubChem CID	7257
UNII	20KR9WJ4NS
UN number	3442 1590
CompTox Dashboard (EPA)	DTXSID7021815
- InChI: InChI=1S/C6H5Cl2N/c7-5-2-1-4(9)3-6(5)8/h1-3H,9H2 Key: SDYWXFYBZPNOFX-UHFFFAOYSA-N 2.1.4 SMILES C1=CC(=C(C=C1N)Cl)Cl

Properties
Chemical formula	C_{6}H_{5}Cl_{2}N
Molar mass	162.01 g·mol^{−1}
Density	1.57
Melting point	66–71 °C (151–160 °F; 339–344 K)
Boiling point	272 °C (522 °F; 545 K)
Solubility in water	92 mg/l at 20 °C
log P	2.69

Hazards
- GHS labelling
Pictograms	(GHS05: Corrosive) (GHS06: Toxic) (GHS07: Exclamation mark) (GHS09: Environmental hazard)
Signal word	Danger
Hazard statements	H301, H311, H317, H318, H331, H410
Precautionary statements	P261, P262, P264, P264+P265, P270, P271, P272, P273, P280, P301+P316, P302+P352, P304+P340, P305+P354+P338, P316, P317, P321, P330, P333+P317, P361+P364, P362+P364, P391, P403+P233, P405, P501
NFPA 704 (fire diamond)	3 1 0
Flash point	166 °C (331 °F; 439 K)
Autoignition temperature	269 °C (516 °F; 542 K)
- Except where otherwise noted, data are given for materials in their standard state (at 25 °C [77 °F], 100 kPa). Infobox references

3,4-Dichloroaniline is an organic compound with the formula C_{6}H_{3}Cl_{2}(NH_{2}). It is one of several isomers of dichloroaniline. It is a white solid although commercial samples often appear gray.

== Applications ==
It is a precursor to dyes, agricultural chemicals, and drugs including the antimalarial chlorproguanil.

Herbicides include: propanil, linuron, DCMU, diuron, Anisuron, Neburon, Phenobenzuron.

On reaction with sodium ethoxide, it goes on to be used in the synthesis of diethofencarb.

Other notable uses include in the synthesis Eclanamine, Cericlamine & Nolinium.

== Preparation ==
It is produced by hydrogenation of 3,4-dichloronitrobenzene.

== Safety and environmental aspects ==
Being a precursor to some herbicides, the toxicity and fate of dichloroaniline is of interest. One pathway for the biodegradation of dichloroaniline is oxidation to the catechol derivatives.
