= 1,2-Dichloro-4-nitrobenzene =

Names
- Preferred IUPAC name 1,2-Dichloro-4-nitrobenzene
- Other names DCNB, 3,4-dichloronitrobenzene

Identifiers
CAS Number	99-54-7
3D model (JSmol)	Interactive image
ChEMBL	ChEMBL167468
ChemSpider	21106095
ECHA InfoCard	100.002.513
EC Number	202-764-2
PubChem CID	7443
RTECS number	CZ5250000
UNII	IJT74JI7FS
UN number	2811 1578
CompTox Dashboard (EPA)	DTXSID8024999
- InChI: InChI=1S/C6H3Cl2NO2/c7-5-2-1-4(9(10)11)3-6(5)8/h1-3H Key: NTBYINQTYWZXLH-UHFFFAOYSA-N; InChI=1/C6H3Cl2NO2/c7-5-2-1-4(9(10)11)3-6(5)8/h1-3H Key: NTBYINQTYWZXLH-UHFFFAOYAQ
- SMILES: Clc1ccc(cc1Cl)[N+]([O-])=O

Properties
Chemical formula	C_{6}H_{3}Cl_{2}NO_{2}
Molar mass	192.01
Appearance	colourless to yellow needles
Density	1.4588 g/cm^{3}
Melting point	52.8 to 56 °C (127.0 to 132.8 °F; 325.9 to 329.1 K)
Boiling point	263 °C (505 °F; 536 K)
Solubility in water	organic solvents

Hazards
- GHS labelling
Pictograms	(GHS07: Exclamation mark) (GHS09: Environmental hazard)
Signal word	Warning
Hazard statements	H302, H317, H319, H411
Precautionary statements	P261, P264, P264+P265, P270, P272, P273, P280, P301+P317, P302+P352, P305+P351+P338, P321, P330, P333+P317, P337+P317, P362+P364, P391, P501
Flash point	124 °C (255 °F; 397 K)
Autoignition temperature	420 °C (788 °F; 693 K)
- Except where otherwise noted, data are given for materials in their standard state (at 25 °C [77 °F], 100 kPa). verify (what is ?) Infobox references

1,2-Dichloro-4-nitrobenzene is an organic compound with the formula 1,2-Cl_{2}C_{6}H_{3}-4-NO_{2}. This pale yellow solid is related to 1,2-dichlorobenzene by the replacement of one H atom with a nitro functional group. This compound is an intermediate in the synthesis of agrochemicals.

== Production and uses ==
The nitration of 1,2-dichlorobenzene mainly produces 1,2-dichloro-4-nitrobenzene, together with smaller amounts of the 3-nitro isomer. It can also be prepared by chlorination of 1-chloro-4-nitrobenzene.

One of the chlorides is reactive toward nucleophiles. Potassium fluoride gives 2-chloro-1-fluoro-4-nitrobenzene, an intermediate in the production of herbicides. With ammonia, one obtains 2-chloro-4-nitroaniline, a precursor to diazo dyes. Reduction with iron powder gives 3,4-dichloroaniline (m.p. 72 °C, CAS# 95-76-1).
