= List of UN numbers 2901 to 3000 =

UN numbers from UN2901 to UN3000 as assigned by the United Nations Committee of Experts on the Transport of Dangerous Goods are as follows:

== UN 2901 to UN 3000 ==
UN Number	Class	Proper Shipping Name
UN 2901	2.3	Bromine chloride
UN 2902	6.1	Pesticides, liquid, toxic, n.o.s.
UN 2903	6.1	Pesticides, liquid, toxic, flammable, flashpoint not less than 23 °C
UN 2904	8	Chlorophenolates, liquid or Phenolates, liquid
UN 2905	8	Chlorophenolates, solid or Phenolates, solid
UN 2906	-	(UN No. no longer in use) Triisocyanatoisocyanurate of Isophoronediisocyanate, solution (UN No. no longer in use)
UN 2907	4.1	Isosorbide dinitrate mixture with not less than 60 percent lactose, mannose, starch or calcium hydrogen phosphate
UN 2908	7	Radioactive material, excepted package—empty packaging
UN 2909	7	Radioactive material, excepted package-articles manufactured from natural or depleted uranium or natural thorium
UN 2910	7	Radioactive material, excepted package-limited quantity of material
UN 2911	7	Radioactive material, excepted package-instruments or articles
UN 2912	7	Radioactive material, low specific activity (LSA-I) [non fissile or fissile-excepted] Radon gas
UN 2913	7	Radioactive material, surface contaminated objects (SCO-I or SCO-II) [non fissile or fissile-excepted]
UN 2914	-	(UN No. no longer in use)
UN 2915	7	Radioactive material, Type A package [non-special form, non fissile or fissile-excepted]
UN 2916	7	Radioactive material, Type B(U) package [non fissile or fissile-excepted]
UN 2917	7	Radioactive material, Type B(M) package [non fissile or fissile-excepted]
UN 2918	(7)	(UN No. no longer in use) Radioactive material, fissile, n.o.s. (UN No. no longer in use)
UN 2919	7	Radioactive material, transported under special arrangement, [non fissile or fissile excepted]
UN 2920	8	Corrosive liquids, flammable, n.o.s.
UN 2921	8	Corrosive solids, flammable, n.o.s.
UN 2922	8(6.1)	Corrosive liquids, toxic, n.o.s.
UN 2923	8	Corrosive solids, toxic, n.o.s.
UN 2924	3	Flammable liquid, corrosive, n.o.s.
UN 2925	4.1	Flammable solids, corrosive, organic, n.o.s.
UN 2926	4.1	Flammable solids, toxic, organic, n.o.s.
UN 2927	6.1	Toxic liquid, corrosive, organic, n.o.s. or Toxic liquid, corrosive, organic, n.o.s. Inhalation Hazard, Packing Group I, Zone A or B
UN 2928	6.1	Toxic solid, corrosive, organic, n.o.s.
UN 2929	6.1	Toxic liquid, flammable, organic, n.o.s. or Toxic liquid, flammable, organic, n.o.s. Inhalation Hazard, Packing Group I, Zone A or B
UN 2930	6.1	Toxic solids, flammable, organic, n.o.s.
UN 2931	6.1	Vanadyl sulfate
UN 2932	?	(UN No. no longer in use)
UN 2933	3	Methyl 2-chloropropionate
UN 2934	3	Isopropyl 2-chloropropionate
UN 2935	3	Ethyl 2-chloropropionate
UN 2936	6.1	Thiolactic acid
UN 2937	6.1	alpha-Methylbenzyl alcohol
UN 2938	?	(UN No. no longer in use) Methyl benzoate (UN No. no longer in use)
UN 2939	?	(UN No. no longer in use)
UN 2940	4.2	9-Phosphabicyclo-nonanes (Cyclooctadiene phosphines)
UN 2941	6.1	Fluoroanilines
UN 2942	6.1	2-Trifluoromethylaniline
UN 2943	3	Tetrahydrofurfurylamine
UN 2944	-	(UN No. no longer in use) 4-Fluoroaniline (UN No. no longer in use)
UN 2945	8	N-Methylbutylamine
UN 2946	6.1	2-Amino-5-diethylaminopentane
UN 2947	3	Isopropyl chloroacetate
UN 2948	6.1	3-Trifluoromethylaniline
UN 2949	8	Sodium hydrosulfide, with not less than 25 percent water of crystallization
UN 2950	4.3	Magnesium granules, coated particle size not less than 149 micrometres
UN 2951	?	(UN No. no longer in use)
UN 2952	?	(UN No. no longer in use) Azodiisobutyronitrile (UN No. no longer in use)
UN 2953	?	(UN No. no longer in use) 2,2´-Azodi-(2,4-dimethylvaleronitrile) (UN No. no longer in use)
UN 2954	?	(UN No. no longer in use) Azodi-(1,1´-hexahydrobenzonitrile) (UN No. no longer in use)
UN 2955	?	(UN No. no longer in use) 2,2´-Azodi-(2,4-dimethyl-4-methoxyvaleronitrile) (UN No. no longer in use)
UN 2956	4.1	5-tert-Butyl-2,4,6-trinitro-m-xylene or Musk xylene
UN 2957 to 2964	?	(UN No.s no longer in use)
UN 2965	4.3	Boron trifluoride dimethyl etherate
UN 2966	6.1	Thioglycol
UN 2967	8	Sulfamic acid
UN 2968	4.3	Maneb stabilized or Maneb preparations, stabilized against self-heating
UN 2969	9	Castor beans or Castor meal or Castor pomace or Castor flake
UN 2970 to 2973	-	(UN No.s no longer in use)
UN 2974	7	(UN No. no longer in use) Radioactive material, special form, n.o.s. (UN No. no longer in use)
UN 2975	7	(UN No. no longer in use) Thorium metal, pyrophoric (UN No. no longer in use)
UN 2976	7	(UN No. no longer in use) Thorium nitrate, solid (UN No. no longer in use)
UN 2977	7	Uranium hexafluoride, fissile
UN 2978	7	Uranium hexafluoride, [non fissile or fissile-excepted]
UN 2979	7	(UN No. no longer in use) Uranium metal, pyrophoric (UN No. no longer in use)
UN 2980	7	(UN No. no longer in use) Uranyl nitrate hexahydrate solution (UN No. no longer in use)
UN 2981	7	(UN No. no longer in use) Uranyl nitrate, solid (UN No. no longer in use)
UN 2982	7	(UN No. no longer in use) Radioactive material, n.o.s (UN No. no longer in use)
UN 2983	3	Ethylene oxide and propylene oxide mixtures with not more than 30 percent ethylene oxide
UN 2984	5.1	Hydrogen peroxide, aqueous solutions with not less than 8 percent but less than 20 percent hydrogen peroxide (stabilized as necessary)
UN 2985	3	Chlorosilanes, flammable, corrosive, n.o.s.
UN 2986	3	Chlorosilanes, corrosive, flammable, n.o.s.
UN 2987	8	Chlorosilanes, corrosive, n.o.s.
UN 2988	4.3	Chlorosilanes, water-reactive, flammable, corrosive, n.o.s.
UN 2989	4.1	Lead phosphite, dibasic
UN 2990	9	Life-saving appliances, self-inflating
UN 2991	3	Carbamate pesticide, liquid, toxic, flammable, flashpoint not less than 23 °C
UN 2992	6.1	Carbamate pesticides, liquid, toxic
UN 2993	3	Arsenical pesticides, liquid, toxic, flammable, flashpoint not less than 23 °C
UN 2994	6.1	Arsenical pesticides, liquid, toxic
UN 2995	6.1	Organochlorine pesticides, liquid, toxic, flammable, flashpoint not less than 23 °C
UN 2996	6.1	Organochlorine pesticide, liquid, toxic
UN 2997	6.1	Triazine pesticides, liquid, toxic, flammable, flashpoint not less than 23 °C
UN 2998	6.1	Triazine pesticides, liquid, toxic
UN 2999	?	(UN No. no longer in use) Phenoxy pesticides, liquid, toxic, flammable (UN No. no longer in use)
UN 3000	?	(UN No. no longer in use) Phenoxy pesticides, liquid, toxic (UN No. no longer in use)

== See also ==
- Lists of UN numbers
