= C6H4ClNO2 =

The molecular formula C_{6}H_{4}ClNO_{2} (molar mass: 157.55 g/mol, exact mass: 156.9931 u) may refer to:

- 2-Chloronicotinic acid
- 2-Nitrochlorobenzene
- 3-Nitrochlorobenzene
- 4-Nitrochlorobenzene
