= Chloronitrobenzene =

Chloronitrobenzene may refer to:

- 2-Chloronitrobenzene
- 3-Chloronitrobenzene
- 4-Chloronitrobenzene
