= C6H6ClN =

The molecular formula C_{6}H_{6}ClN (molar mass: 127.57 g/mol) may refer to:

- Chloroanilines
  - 2-Chloroaniline
  - 3-Chloroaniline
  - 4-Chloroaniline
- Chloromethylpyridines
  - 2-Chloromethylpyridine
  - 3-Chloromethylpyridine
  - 4-Chloromethylpyridine
