= C6H4FNO2 =

The molecular formula C_{6}H_{4}FNO_{2} may refer to:

- 2-Fluoronitrobenzene
- 3-Fluoronitrobenzene
- 4-Fluoronitrobenzene

== See also ==
- Fluoronitrobenzene
