= C7H6F3N =

The molecular formula C_{7}H_{6}F_{3}N may refer to:

- 3-(Trifluoromethyl)aniline
- 4-(Trifluoromethyl)aniline
