= 3-Chloroaniline =

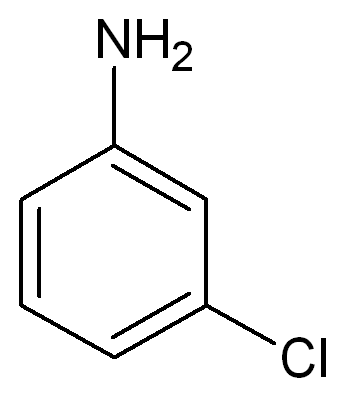

Names
- IUPAC name 3-chloroaniline
- Other names: m-chloroaniline

Identifiers
CAS Number	108-42-9
3D model (JSmol)	Interactive image
ChEBI	CHEBI:229245
ChEMBL	ChEMBL325415
ChemSpider	13869451
ECHA InfoCard	100.003.256
EC Number	203-581-0
PubChem CID	7932
UNII	6GKR52SKIY
UN number	2019
CompTox Dashboard (EPA)	DTXSID0024761
- InChI: Key: PNPCRKVUWYDDST-UHFFFAOYSA-N; InChI=1S/C6H6ClN/c7-5-2-1-3-6(8)4-5/h1-4H,8H2
- SMILES: C1=CC(=CC(=C1)Cl)N

Properties
Chemical formula	C6H6ClN
Appearance	Colorless to amber liquid, darkens in storage
Odor	Sweet
Density	1.2150 g/mL at 22 °C
Melting point	−10.4 °C (13.3 °F; 262.8 K)
Boiling point	230.5 °C (446.9 °F; 503.6 K)
Solubility in water	5.4 g/L (20 °C)
Solubility	Miscible in ethanol, ether, and acetone
log P	1.88
Vapor pressure	0.066 mmHg (25 °C)
Acidity (pK_{a})	3.521 (conjugate acid) (25 °C)

Hazards
- GHS labelling
Pictograms	(GHS06: Toxic) (GHS07: Exclamation mark) (GHS08: Health hazard) (GHS09: Environmental hazard)
Signal word	Danger
Hazard statements	H301, H301+H311, H311, H317, H319, H330, H331, H350, H372, H373, H410
Precautionary statements	P203, P260, P262, P264, P264+P265, P270, P271, P272, P273, P280, P284, P301+P316, P302+P352, P304+P340, P305+P351+P338, P316, P318, P319, P320, P321, P330, P333+P317, P361, P362+P364, P364, P391, P403+P233, P405, P501
Flash point	118 °C (244 °F; 391 K)
Autoignition temperature	>540 °C (1,004 °F; 813 K)

Related compounds
Related compounds	4-Chloroaniline 2,4,6-trichloroaniline
- Except where otherwise noted, data are given for materials in their standard state (at 25 °C [77 °F], 100 kPa). Infobox references

3-Chloroaniline or meta-chloroaniline is an organochlorine compound with the formula ClC_{6}H_{4}NH_{2}. It is one of three structural isomers of chloroaniline. It is a colorless to light amber liquid with a sweet odor.

== Preparation ==
3-Chloroaniline is prepared by hydrogenation of 3-nitrochlorobenzene. This process employs noble metal or noble metal sulfides as catalysts, as well as metal oxides to prevent dehalogenation. The yield is about 98%. Alternatively, 3-nitrochlorobenzene can be produced by reduction with sodium hydrosulfide.

== Uses ==
3-Chloroaniline is used as a chemical intermediate. It is used to produce herbicides such as chlorpropham and m-chlorophenyl isocyanurate. It is also used in production of pharmaceuticals, azo dyes, and insecticides.

== Toxicity ==
3-Chloroaniline causes methemoglobinemia and can cause acute contact dermatitis. Inhalation can cause symptoms such as dizziness, vomiting, and unconsciousness.
