= Halex process =

Chemical process for converting aromatic chlorides to fluorides

In chemistry, the Halex process is used to convert aromatic chlorides to the corresponding aromatic fluorides. The process entails Halide exchange, hence the name. The reaction conditions call for hot (150–250 °C) solutions of the aryl chloride and anhydrous potassium fluoride. Typical solvents are dimethylsulfoxide, dimethylformamide, and sulfolane. Potassium chloride is generated in the process. The reaction is mainly applied to nitro-substituted aryl chlorides. Sometimes more soluble fluorides, such as caesium fluoride and TBAF are used.

The following reactions are practiced commercially in this manner:

2-nitrochlorobenzene → 2-fluoronitrobenzene
4-nitrochlorobenzene → 1-fluoro-4-nitrobenzene
1,2-dichloronitrobenzene → 1-chloro-2-fluoro-5-nitrobenzene
1,4-dichloronitrobenzene → 1-chloro-4-fluoro-3-nitrobenzene
1-chloro-2,4-dinitrobenzene → 1-fluoro-2,4-dinitrobenzene
5-chloro-2-nitrobenzotrifluoride → 5-fluoro-2-nitrobenzotrifluoride
1,3-dichloro-4-nitrobenzene → 1,3-difluoro-4-nitrobenzene
2,6-dichlorobenzonitrile → 2,6-difluorobenzonitrile

The nitro groups in the above compounds can be reduced to give the corresponding aniline. For example, selective hydrogenation of 4-fluoronitrobenzene gives 4-fluoroaniline. Thus, the Halex method provides access to a host of fluoroanilines.

For producing aryl fluorides, the Halex process is complementary to the Balz-Schiemann reaction and its variants.
