= Chlorophenyl azide =

There are three chlorophenyl azides:

- 2-Chlorophenyl azide (ortho)
- 3-Chlorophenyl azide (meta)
- 4-Chlorophenyl azide (para)
