= TBA (disambiguation) =

TBA stands for 'to be announced' or 'to be arranged'.

TBA or Tba may also refer to:

== Arts and entertainment ==
- Time-Based Art Festival, in Portland, Oregon, United States
- Turning the beat around, in electronic music
- TBA Studios, a Philippine film studio
- TBA, an Indonesian band formerly known as CJR

== Chemicals ==
- 2,4,6-Tribromoanisole, causing cork taint
- Trichlorobenzoic acid, whose isomers have various uses

== Other uses ==
- TransBrasil (airline), ICAO airline designator
- Technical Board of Appeal, a type of Board of Appeal at the European Patent Office
- Traditional birth attendant, an untrained midwife
- Trenes de Buenos Aires, an Argentine railway company
- Trockenbeerenauslese, a style of German or Austrian dessert wine
