= Halex =

Halex may refer to:

- The Halex process in chemistry
- Halex, a brand of electrical fitting from the Scott Fetzer Company
- Halex, a subsidiary of the British Xylonite Company
