= Nitrochlorobenzene =

Nitrochlorobenzene may refer to:

- 2-Nitrochlorobenzene
- 3-Nitrochlorobenzene
- 4-Nitrochlorobenzene
