= DPMI =

DPMI may refer to:

- DOS Protected Mode Interface
- Cashmeran (6,7-dihydro-1,1,2,3,3-pentamethyl-4(5H)-indanone), a synthetic musk
