= SP Chemicals =

SP Chemicals Ltd.
- Type: Public (SGX: S17)
- Industry: Manufacturing
- Founded: 1990
- Headquarters: Singapore
- Products: Chemicals, Plastics, and other Specialized Products & Services
- Revenue: ▲$1.501 Billion RMB (2006)
- Net income: ▲$443 Million RMB (2006)
- Number of employees: 1,003 (2006)
- Website: www.spchemicals.com

SP Chemicals, a Singapore-based company, is one of the largest ion-exchange membrane chlor-alkali producer and aniline producer in the PRC. It was listed on the Main Board of SGX-ST on 6 August 2003.

== Products ==
SP Chemicals engages in the manufacture and sale of the chemical industry's basic building blocks - caustic soda, chlorine, hydrogen and its related downstream products. Their products are materials widely used in various applications across a diverse range of industries. Products include: aniline, caustic soda, chlorine, chlorobenzene, nitrochlorobenzene, nitrobenzene, vinyl chloride monomer (VCM). To further drive its growth, SP Chemicals plans to invest approximately RMB1.1 billion in facilities for the production of styrene monomer, an intermediate raw chemical used in making polystyrene plastics, protective coatings, polyesters and resins.

== Vietnam Petrochemical Industrial Park ==
SP Chemicals was planning to build an integrated petrochemical park of 1,300 hectares and a naphtha cracking plant in the Vietnam Petrochemical Industrial Park, with a production capacity of 800,000 tpa of ethylene, to supply raw materials to their own facilities in the PRC, and Hoa Tam Petrochemical Park, and, to a lesser extent, for export.

The project was targeted to be completed within 15 years in 2 development phases:

- Phase One – To build a naphtha cracking and utility plant; targeted to be completed in 2014 at an investment of US$1.5 billion.
- Phase Two – To promote the Hoa Tam Petrochem Park and invite investment for upstream and downstream petrochemical projects; targeted to be completed by 2024.

The project was canceled in May 2009, due to economic headwinds coupled with projections of increased production of petrochemical intermediates (such as ethylene) within China.
