= TBD =

TBD may refer to:

== Arts and media ==
- TBD (TV network), an American broadcast television network for millennials
- TBD TV (now WJLA 24/7 News), a local cable news channel for Washington, D.C.
- TBD Records, an American record label
- TBD.com, a defunct news website for Washington, D.C.
- "T.B.D.", a song by Live from Throwing Copper
- Time Balance Department, a faction in the Cookie Run series
- Three Busy Debras, an American comedy television series

== Military ==
- Douglas TBD Devastator, a WWII torpedo aircraft
- Torpedo boat destroyer, the forerunner to the modern naval destroyer
- Track-before-detect, a radar detection method

== Other uses ==
- To be decided
- To be declared
- To be defined
- To be determined
- To be discussed
- To be done
- Triazabicyclodecene, a chemical compound
- Three Bridges railway station, Sussex, England (by GBR code)
- Timbiqui Airport, Cauca, Colombia (by IATA code)

== See also ==
- TBA (disambiguation)
