= Chlorpropham =

Names
- Preferred IUPAC name Propan-2-yl (3-chlorophenyl)carbamate
- Other names Chlorpropham, CIPC, isopropyl N-(3-chlorophenyl) carbamate

Identifiers
CAS Number	101-21-3
3D model (JSmol)	Interactive image
ChEBI	CHEBI:34630
ChemSpider	2627
ECHA InfoCard	100.002.660
EC Number	202-925-7
KEGG	C14506
PubChem CID	2728
UNII	0HBU04R8B0
CompTox Dashboard (EPA)	DTXSID7020764
- InChI: InChI=1S/C10H12ClNO2/c1-7(2)14-10(13)12-9-5-3-4-8(11)6-9/h3-7H,1-2H3,(H,12,13) Key: CWJSHJJYOPWUGX-UHFFFAOYSA-N; InChI=1/C10H12ClNO2/c1-7(2)14-10(13)12-9-5-3-4-8(11)6-9/h3-7H,1-2H3,(H,12,13) Key: CWJSHJJYOPWUGX-UHFFFAOYAV
- SMILES: CC(C)OC(=O)NC1=CC(=CC=C1)Cl

Properties
Chemical formula	C_{10}H_{12}ClNO_{2}
Molar mass	213.66 g·mol^{−1}
Appearance	Beige to brown solid
Density	1.18 g/cm^{3}
Melting point	41 to 42 °C (106 to 108 °F; 314 to 315 K)
- Except where otherwise noted, data are given for materials in their standard state (at 25 °C [77 °F], 100 kPa). Infobox references

Chlorpropham or CIPC is a plant growth regulator and herbicide used as a sprout suppressant for grass weeds, alfalfa, lima and snap beans, blueberries, cane fruit, carrots, cranberries, ladino clover, garlic, seed grass, onions, spinach, sugar beets, tomatoes, safflower, soybeans, gladioli and woody nursery stock. It is also used to inhibit potato sprouting and for sucker control in tobacco. Chlorpropham is available in emulsifiable concentrate and liquid formulations.

Chlorpropham is approved for use in the United States as a plant regulator and herbicide only on potatoes. The use of CIPC was banned in the EU and UK in 2019 after it was not reauthorised for use due to toxicity concerns, with sales prohibited from January 2020.

== Uses ==
When it is used as an anti-sprouting agent for potatoes, the formulation is based on HN formulation, Hot Fogging.

Commercial names include Pin Nip, Bud Nip, Taterpex, Preventol, Elbanil, Metoxon, Nexoval, Stickman Pistols, Preweed, Furloe, Stopgerme-S, Sprout Nip, Mirvale, Bygran, ChlorIPC, Spud-Nic, Spud-Nie, Chloro-IFK, Chloro-IPC, Keim-stop, Triherbicide CIPC, OORJA. For herbicide, an EC formulation is used so that it is dissolvable in water for spray in the field.

== Toxicity ==
Chlorpropham displays a low level toxicity profile, with no signs of acute toxicity after exposure of less than 1000 mg/kg/day. Long term exposure at high doses (≥ 1000 mg/kg/day) could cause reduction of body weight gain, decrease in hematocrit and hemoglobin, and increase in blood reticulocytes.

Regarding the carcinogenic risk, chlorpropham is classified by the EPA as group E (non-carcinogenic). One of its metabolites is 3-Chloroaniline.

The acceptable daily intake ranges from 0.03 mg/kg (FAO 2001) to 0.05 mg/Kg (EPA 1996 and EC 2003).

== Stability ==
Chlorpropham is partially degraded in the environment under aerobic conditions (15% to 30% after 100 days) and partially hydrolysed in water solution (90% after 59 to 130 days).

A study of the stability of chlorpropham in potatoes (estimated concentration of chlorpropham: 1.8 to 7.6 mg/kg at 10 days post-application) revealed that mean concentration of chlorpropham in the tuber decreased spontaneously by 24% and 42% at 28 days and 65 days postapplication respectively. The study also showed that peeling removed 91–98% and washing 33–47%. Residues of chlorpropham were detected in the boiled potatoes, in the boiling water, in the French-fried potatoes and in the frying oil. According to this study, the theoretical dose for a 20 kg infant eating 100g of crude-peeled tuber would be 0.00018 to 0.00342 mg/kg.
