= 4-Chloroaniline =

Chemical compound

Names
- Preferred IUPAC name 4-Chloroaniline
- Other names p-Chloroaniline

Identifiers
CAS Number	106-47-8
3D model (JSmol)	Interactive image
Beilstein Reference	471359
ChEBI	CHEBI:20331
ChEMBL	ChEMBL15888
ChemSpider	13869339
ECHA InfoCard	100.003.093
KEGG	C14450
PubChem CID	7812
RTECS number	BX0700000
UNII	Z553SGH315
UN number	2018
CompTox Dashboard (EPA)	DTXSID9020295
- InChI: InChI=1S/C6H6ClN/c7-5-1-3-6(8)4-2-5/h1-4H,8H2 Key: QSNSCYSYFYORTR-UHFFFAOYSA-N
- SMILES: C1=CC(=CC=C1N)Cl

Properties
Chemical formula	ClC_{6}H_{4}NH_{2}
Appearance	Pale yellow solid
Density	1.43 g/cm^{3}
Melting point	72.5 °C (162.5 °F; 345.6 K)
Boiling point	232 °C (450 °F; 505 K)
Solubility in water	2.6 g/L at 20 °C

Hazards
- Occupational safety and health (OHS/OSH)
Main hazards	Very toxic, possible carcinogen. Absorbed through skin.
- GHS labelling
Pictograms	(GHS06: Toxic) (GHS07: Exclamation mark) (GHS08: Health hazard) (GHS09: Environmental hazard)
Signal word	Danger
Hazard statements	H301, H311, H317, H331, H350, H400
Precautionary statements	P201, P202, P261, P264, P270, P271, P272, P273, P280, P281, P301+P310, P302+P352, P304+P340, P308+P313, P311, P312, P321, P322, P330, P333+P313, P361, P363, P391, P403+P233, P405, P501
Flash point	113 °C (235 °F; 386 K)
Safety data sheet (SDS)	External MSDS

Related compounds
Related compounds	2,4,6-Trichloroaniline
- Except where otherwise noted, data are given for materials in their standard state (at 25 °C [77 °F], 100 kPa). Infobox references

4-Chloroaniline is an organochlorine compound with the formula ClC_{6}H_{4}NH_{2}. This pale yellow solid is one of the three isomers of chloroaniline.

== Preparation ==
4-Chloroaniline is not prepared from aniline, which tends to overchlorinate. Instead, it is prepared by reduction of 4-nitrochlorobenzene, which in turn is prepared by nitration of chlorobenzene.

== Uses ==
4-Chloroaniline is used in the industrial production of pesticides, drugs, and dyestuffs. It is a precursor to the widely used antimicrobial and bacteriocide chlorhexidine and is used in the manufacture of pesticides, including pyraclostrobin, anilofos, monolinuron, and chlorphthalim.

4-Chloroaniline exhibits antimicrobial action against some bacteria and molds.
