= 2,4,6-Trichlorobenzoyl chloride =

Names
- Preferred IUPAC name 2,4,6-Trichlorobenzoyl chloride
- Other names Yamaguchi's reagent

Identifiers
CAS Number	4136-95-2
3D model (JSmol)	Interactive image
Abbreviations	TCBC
Beilstein Reference	2050280
ChemSpider	2015479
ECHA InfoCard	100.120.466
EC Number	609-916-0
PubChem CID	2733703
UNII	1083Y98L1D
UN number	3265
CompTox Dashboard (EPA)	DTXSID80369980
- InChI: InChI=1S/C7H2Cl4O/c8-3-1-4(9)6(7(11)12)5(10)2-3/h1-2H Key: OZGSEIVTQLXWRO-UHFFFAOYSA-N
- SMILES: C1=C(C=C(C(=C1Cl)C(=O)Cl)Cl)Cl

Properties
Chemical formula	C_{7}H_{2}Cl_{4}O
Molar mass	243.89 g·mol^{−1}
Appearance	Light yellow liquid
Density	1.561 g/mL
Boiling point	107 - 108 °C (225 - 226 °F)
Solubility in water	Reacts with water
log P	2.738

Hazards
- GHS labelling
Pictograms	(GHS05: Corrosive)
Signal word	Danger
Hazard statements	H314
Precautionary statements	P264, P280, P301+P330+P331, P303+P361+P353, P304+P340+P310, P305+P351+P338+P310, P363, P405, P501
NFPA 704 (fire diamond)	3 0 0
Flash point	113 °C
- Except where otherwise noted, data are given for materials in their standard state (at 25 °C [77 °F], 100 kPa). Infobox references

2,4,6-Trichlorobenzoyl chloride or Yamaguchi's reagent is an chlorinated aromatic compound that is commonly used in a variety of organic syntheses.

== Yamaguchi esterification ==
It is the primary reactant in Yamaguchi esterification. 2,4,6-Trichlorobenzoyl chloride readily reacts with alcohols. This newly formed reagent, when mixed with a stoichiometric amount of 4-dimethylaminopyridine, cyclizes and forms esters. This reaction creates 2,4,6-trichlorobenzoic acid as a byproduct.

== Preparation ==
2,4,6-Trichlorobenzoyl chloride is prepared by reacting 2,4,6-trichloroaniline with n-butyllithium in a carbon dioxide atmosphere. This produces 2,4,6-trichlorobenzoic acid, which can then be refluxed in thionyl chloride to form 2,4,6-trichlorobenzoyl chloride.

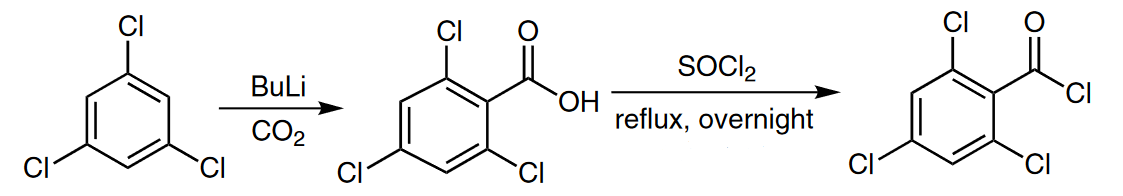

Since 2,4,6-trichlorobenzoic acid is produced as a by product of the Yamaguchi esterification process, it can be refluxed again to recreate 2,4,6-trichlorobenzoyl chloride.
