= 4-Nitrothiophenol =

Names
- Preferred IUPAC name 4-Nitrobenzene-1-thiol
- Other names 4-nitrobenzenethiol

Identifiers
CAS Number	1849-36-1
3D model (JSmol)	Interactive image
ChEMBL	ChEMBL120606
ChemSpider	15030
ECHA InfoCard	100.015.852
EC Number	217-436-4
PubChem CID	15809
UNII	QL9H28763R
CompTox Dashboard (EPA)	DTXSID1075145
- InChI: InChI=1S/C6H5NO2S/c8-7(9)5-1-3-6(10)4-2-5/h1-4,10H Key: AXBVSRMHOPMXBA-UHFFFAOYSA-N
- SMILES: C1=CC(=CC=C1[N+](=O)[O-])S

Properties
Chemical formula	C_{6}H_{5}NO_{2}S
Molar mass	155.17 g·mol^{−1}
Appearance	yellow solid
Density	1.362 g/cm^{3}
Melting point	79–80 °C (174–176 °F; 352–353 K)
Solubility in water	alcohols

Hazards
- GHS labelling
Pictograms	(GHS07: Exclamation mark)
Signal word	Warning
Hazard statements	H315, H319, H335
Precautionary statements	P261, P264, P264+P265, P271, P280, P302+P352, P304+P340, P305+P351+P338, P319, P321, P332+P317, P337+P317, P362+P364, P403+P233, P405, P501
- Except where otherwise noted, data are given for materials in their standard state (at 25 °C [77 °F], 100 kPa). Infobox references

4-Nitrothiophenol is an organosulfur compound with the formula HSC_{6}H_{4}NO_{2}. It exists as a yellow solid that is soluble in several organic solvents. It is one of three isomers of nitrothiophenol. It was originally prepared by sulfidation of 4-nitrochlorobenzene, which was improved by intentionally generating a polysulfide intermediate. 4-Nitrothiophenol is closely related to thiophenol but more acidic.

The compound reacts with chlorine to give 4-nitrophenylsulfenyl chloride, a useful reagent. It has also been used as a probe of plasmon-induced reactions.
