= 4-Chlorophenyl azide =

- Ball and Stick model of 4-chlorophenyl azide

Names
- Preferred IUPAC name 1-Azido-4-chlorobenzene
- Other names 4-chlorophenylazide

Identifiers
CAS Number	3296-05-7
3D model (JSmol)	Interactive image
ChemSpider	69259
PubChem CID	76803
CompTox Dashboard (EPA)	DTXSID60186612
- InChI: InChI=1S/C6H4ClN3/c7-5-1-3-6(4-2-5)9-10-8/h1-4H Key: HZVGOEUGZJFTNN-UHFFFAOYSA-N
- SMILES: Clc1ccc(\N=[N+]=[N-])cc1

Properties
Chemical formula	C_{6}H_{4}ClN_{3}
Molar mass	153.569 g/mol
Appearance	Brown solid
Density	1.2634 g/cm^{3}
Melting point	20 °C (68 °F; 293 K)
Boiling point	96 °C (205 °F; 369 K)
Solubility in water	Insoluble in H_{2}O; Soluble in diethyl ether
log P	−3.71

Hazards
- GHS labelling
Pictograms	(GHS06: Toxic)
Signal word	Danger
Hazard statements	H225, H302, H315
Precautionary statements	P264, P270, P301+P310, P321, P330, P405, P501
NFPA 704 (fire diamond)	2 3 0
- Safety data sheet (SDS)
- Except where otherwise noted, data are given for materials in their standard state (at 25 °C [77 °F], 100 kPa). Infobox references

4-Chlorophenyl azide is an organic aryl azide compound with the chemical formula C_{6}H_{4}ClN_{3}. The geometry between the nitrogen atoms in the azide functional group is approximately linear while the geometry between the nitrogen and the carbon of the benzene is trigonal planar.

== Preparation ==
There are various methods to synthesize this aryl azide. One such method is the reaction of 4-chloroaniline with sodium nitrite (NaNO_{2}) and hydrazine hydrate in the presence of acetic acid.

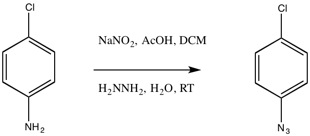

== Reactions ==
Aryl azides such as 4-chlorophenyl azide are important in click chemistry. The azide reacts in a cycloaddition with alkyl-nitriles to form 1,2,3-triazoles.

== Applications ==
The use of azides is very important in a variety of different applications in organic and biological chemistry. Azides are used in the research of drug applications, in materials science, and also all throughout biology. A majority of the research that is conducted on azides pertains to the catalyst that is needed to create the azide itself. Previously stated, LAH was used for the conversion of the amine to the azide, but this is not always the most environmentally beneficial way of forming the desired product. Research is conducted in many different biological environments to see if a certain catalyst will be recyclable and/or environmentally friendly.

One specific application of 4-chlorophenyl azide is in Friedel Crafts acylation and alkylation. The azide on 4-chlorophenyl azide acts as an electron withdrawing group since the azide has a partial positive charge that is withdrawing electrons from the ring. This means that the azide substituent acts as a meta director in Friedel Crafts acylation and alkylation. Consequently, the chloride on 4-chlorphenyl azide is a deactivating agent, but it also directs to the ortho/para positions on the aromatic ring. Due to the substituent effects on 4-chlorophenyl azide, acylation and alkylation would yield a major product that is newly substituted in the 3- and 5-positions on the aromatic ring. An example of this reaction is given below:

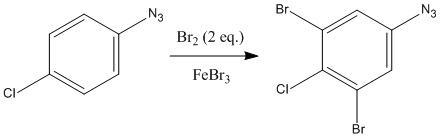
Amine formation

Another application of 4-chlorophenyl azide is through the use of fungicides on plant pathogens. It is important to control fungal pathogens on plants so that there is a high crop yield during the harvesting season. A multitude of compounds were tested on plant seeds to test the effectiveness of the fungicide. 4-Chlorophenyl Azide was a substituent bonded to the main molecular compound of which the entire research was conducted.

== Structure and Bonding ==
4-chlorophenyl azide is an aryl azide. This is a benzene ring with an azide group and a chloride ion connected in the para position. The azide group is characterized by three nitrogen atoms connected together by two double bonds and is isoelectric with CO_{2}.
