= Trichlorobenzoic acid =

Trichlorobenzoic acids (TBAs) are organochlorine compounds, in particular benzoic acids, with the formula C_{6}H_{2}Cl_{3}CO_{2}H. Six constitutional isomers exist, differing in the relative position of the three chlorine substituents around the ring.

Trichlorobenzoic acids
Name	2,3,4-Trichlorobenzoic acid	2,3,5-Trichlorobenzoic acid	2,3,6-Trichlorobenzoic acid	2,4,5-Trichlorobenzoic acid	2,4,6-Trichlorobenzoic acid	3,4,5-Trichlorobenzoic acid
Structure						
CAS Registry Number	[50-75-9]	[50-73-7]	[50-31-7]	[50-82-8]	[50-43-1]	[51-39-8]

== Preparation and use ==
The 2,4,6- isomer is easily produced by deprotonation of 1,3,5-trichlorobenzene followed by reaction with carbon dioxide. Its conversion to 2,4,6-trichlorobenzoyl chloride makes it a key intermediate in the Yamaguchi esterification protocol.

== Related compounds ==
- Chlorobenzoic acid
- 2,4-Dichlorobenzoic acid
