= Musk xylene =

- Kekulé, skeletal formula of musk xylene

Names
- Preferred IUPAC name 1-tert-Butyl-3,5-dimethyl-2,4,6-trinitrobenzene

Identifiers
CAS Number	81-15-2
3D model (JSmol)	Interactive image
ChEBI	CHEBI:77320
ChEMBL	ChEMBL228513
ChemSpider	56123
ECHA InfoCard	100.001.210
EC Number	201-329-4
KEGG	C19462
MeSH	musk+xylene
PubChem CID	62329
UNII	1ZAO16GU5K
UN number	2956
CompTox Dashboard (EPA)	DTXSID1021405
- InChI: InChI=1S/C12H15N3O6/c1-6-9(13(16)17)7(2)11(15(20)21)8(12(3,4)5)10(6)14(18)19/h1-5H3 Key: XMWRWTSZNLOZFN-UHFFFAOYSA-N
- SMILES: CC1=C(C(=C(C(C)=C1N(=O)=O)N(=O)=O)C(C)(C)C)N(=O)=O

Properties
Chemical formula	C_{12}H_{15}N_{3}O_{6}
Molar mass	297.2640 g mol^{−1}
Appearance	Yellow crystals
Odor	Musk-like
Melting point	110 °C (230 °F; 383 K)
Solubility in water	150 ng dm^{−1}
log P	4.369
Vapor pressure	9.7 mPa (at 40 °C)

Hazards
- GHS labelling
Pictograms	(GHS01: Explosive) (GHS08: Health hazard) (GHS09: Environmental hazard)
Signal word	Danger
Hazard statements	H201, H351, H410
Precautionary statements	P201, P202, P210, P230, P240, P250, P273, P280, P281, P308+P313, P370+P380, P372, P373, P391, P401, P405, P501
Flash point	2 °C (36 °F; 275 K)
Autoignition temperature	305 to 341 °C (581 to 646 °F; 578 to 614 K)

Related compounds
Related nitro musks	Musk ambrette
Related compounds	Trinitrotoluene
- Except where otherwise noted, data are given for materials in their standard state (at 25 °C [77 °F], 100 kPa). verify (what is ?) Infobox references

Musk xylene is a synthetic musk fragrance which mimics natural musk. It has been used as a perfume fixative in a wide variety of consumer products, and is still used in some cosmetics and fragrances.

Musk xylene was once the most widely used of the "nitro-musks", but its use has declined sharply since the mid-1980s due to safety and environmental concerns. Its explosive and carcinogenic hazards are recognized to be borderline, and musk xylene is a useful example of the lowest level of such risks which need to be taken into account. However, it is a very persistent and very bioaccumulative pollutant in the aquatic environment (vPvB substance), and is the first substance to be proposed as a "substance of very high concern" (SVHC) for these reasons alone under the European Union REACH Regulation. Since no company has applied for authorisation, it is banned in the EU.

== Synonyms ==
Musk xylene is also known in english as musk xylol, 1-tert-butyl-3,5-dimethyl-2,4,6-trinitrobenzene, tert-butyl-trinitro-xylene, 5-tert-butyl-2,4,6-trinitroxylene, 1-(1,1-dimethylethyl)-3,5-dimethyl-2,4,6-trinitrobenzene, 2,4,6-trinitro-1,3-dimethyl-5-tert-butylbenzene, 2,4,6-trinitro-3,5-dimethyl-tert-butylbenzene, 5-tert-butyl-2,4,6-trinitro-m-xylene, 5-tert-butyl-2,4,6-trinitro-meta-xylene and xylene musk.

== Production and use ==
Musk xylene is produced from meta-xylene (1,3-dimethylbenzene), by a Friedel–Crafts alkylation with tert-butyl chloride and aluminium chloride followed by nitration with fuming nitric acid or with a 70:30 mixture of nitric acid and sulfuric acid. The crude product is recrystallized from 95% ethanol.

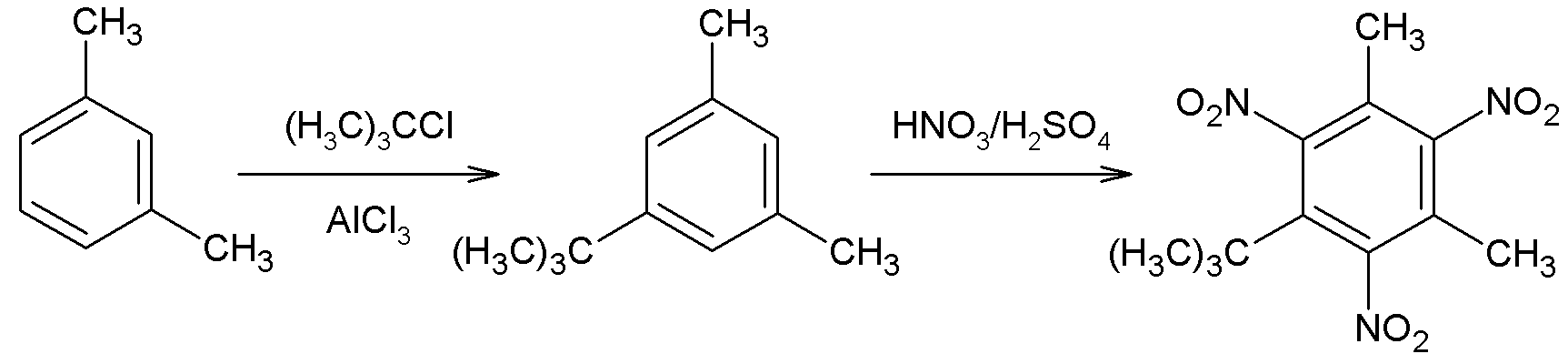

Use of musk xylene in various domestic products
Product	Mass fraction (%)
Skin cream	0.0075
Deodorant	0.0075
Shampoo	0.01
Household detergents	0.02
Aftershave	0.03
Toilet soap	0.04
Air freshener	0.07
Cologne/eau de toilette	0.075
Fine fragrance	0.05–0.1
Sources: International Agency for Research on Cancer (1996); European Union Risk Assessment Report (2005).
NOTE: Use of musk xylene varies widely between different countries and manufacturers; these figures should be regarded as indicative maxima for the period 1990–present.

Musk xylene has been used in a wide variety of consumer products since the early 1900s, usually in very small quantities. World production of nitro musks in 1987 was about 2500 tonnes, but had fallen to about 1000 tonnes by the early 1990s: musk xylene made up roughly two-thirds of the production of nitro musks during this period. Production was concentrated in Western Europe, with the United Kingdom alone accounting for 28% of world production of nitro musks.

Use of musk xylene continued to decline through the 1990s, as fragrance manufacturers voluntarily switched to alternative fragrance compounds. For example, musk xylene has not been used in Japanese products (on a voluntary basis) since 1982, and the Association of the German Toiletries and Detergents Industry (IKW) recommended the replacement of musk xylene by another compound in 1993. Production of musk xylene in the European Union came to a halt and, by 2000 (the last year for which full data are available), imports to Europe were only 67 tonnes, with China as the most important source. The estimated 2008 usage of musk xylene in the European Union was 25 tonnes.

Musk xylene permitted until 2011 for use in cosmetics products (except oral care products) in the European Union under the Cosmetics Directive. The permitted quantities are: up to 1% in fine fragrances; up to 0.4% in eau de toilette; up to 0.03% in other products. European Union suppliers must inform their customers on request if a product contains more than 0.1% by weight of musk xylene. In 2011, it is listed as a product to "be banned within the next three to five years unless an authorisation has been granted to individual companies for their use".

== Safety ==
Musk xylene is an analogue of the explosive trinitrotoluene (TNT), so it is unsurprising that its safety characteristics have been studied in some detail. Indeed, the nitro musks were first discovered in an attempt to produce new high explosives. It has also been used – albeit in very small amounts – in mass-market consumer products for the last hundred years. The discovery of musk xylene residues in the environment prompted new concerns about its possible long-term toxicity, and led to the sharp decline in its use from the mid to late 1980s. The European Chemicals Agency has listed musk xylene as a "substance of very high concern" (SVHC) under the REACH Regulation, judging it to be "very persistent and very bioaccumulative" (vPvB) but not meeting the criteria for human or environmental toxicity to be of concern.

=== Explosive properties ===
Musk xylene is used as an example case in the United Nations Manual of Test Methods and Criteria as a substance which shows some explosive properties but which does not have to be transported as Class 1 dangerous goods under the Model Regulations. It is transported as small flakes in plastic bags (maximum 50 kg net mass), which are themselves within cardboard drums to avoid tearing. This does not count as "confinement" in the meaning of explosives tests: indeed, the special packing is intended to prevent over-confinement during transport.

It will explode when detonated under confinement (UN gap test) or when heated under confinement (Koenen test), but does not explode under the BAM fallhammer test (limiting impact energy 25 J) or the BAM friction test (limiting load >360 N). There is no ignition, explosion, self-heating or visible decomposition when musk xylene is heated (without confinement) to 75 °C for 48 hours.

Nevertheless, musk xylene is classified in the European Union as an explosive under the Dangerous Substances Directive and as a category 1.1 explosive under the CLP Regulation. The European Union classification reflects the fact that hazardous heating under confinement cannot be excluded in the industrial use of musk xylene, as opposed to its transport, and so it is necessary to warn potential users of the risk.

=== Carcinogenicity ===
Musk xylene also demonstrates some of the problems of classifying substances as carcinogens. It has been placed into Group 3 ("not classifiable as to their carcinogenicity to humans") by the International Agency for Research on Cancer (IARC), and is classified in the European Union as category 3 carcinogen ("cause concern for man owing to possible carcinogenic effects but in respect of which the available information is not adequate for making a satisfactory assessment") under the Dangerous Substances Directive and a category 2 carcinogen ("suspected human carcinogen") under the CLP Regulation.

These classifications are based mainly on a single study of oral exposure to musk xylene in B6C3F1-strain mice. The mice showed a highly significant increase in liver adenomas and carcinomas at median dietary intakes of 170 mg/kg body weight (males) and 192 mg/kg body weight (females), as well as significant increases in adenomas in the Harderian gland (male mice only) and in the liver at median dietary intakes of 91 mg/kg body weight (males) and 101 mg/kg body weight (females).

The European Union Risk Assessment Report makes a number of observations about this study:

- it was conducted on a single species; no studies are available on, for example, rats;
- B6C3F1-strain mice are known to be particularly prone to liver cancers;
- the doses were high, and toxic effects (especially on the liver) were observed in the test animals;
- the mechanism of tumour development is unclear.

Musk xylene is not genotoxic. It has significant effects on liver function which are similar to those shown by phenobarbital, for example, induction of CYP2B6 and other cytochrome P450 enzymes. The human carcinogenicity of phenobarbital has been the subject of debate, but it is currently classified in group 2B by the IARC and this appears to have been an important consideration in the classification of musk xylene as a category 3 carcinogen under the Dangerous Substances Directive. Nevertheless, the European Union Risk Assessment Report admits that musk xylene is a "borderline case".

A further complication is the metabolism of musk xylene. One route of metabolism is through reduction of one or more nitro groups by the intestinal microflora (gut bacteria) to produce aromatic amines such as p-NH_{2}-musk xylene. This metabolite has a different liver toxicity: in particular, it inhibits the CYP1B enzymes by covalent binding.

Induction of cytochrome P450 enzymes, the most likely cause of rodent carcinogenicity, is a threshold phenomenon, with a no observed effect level (NOEL) of 10 mg/kg/day in mice and a lowest observed effect level (LOEL) of 10 mg/kg/day in rats. The lowest oral dose which caused cancer (LOAEL) in B6C3F1-mice was 70 mg/kg/day. These are 1–3 orders of magnitude higher than human exposure, which is principally dermal rather than oral.

=== Environmental concerns ===
The first concerns about musk xylene arose in the early 1980s, with the detection of musk xylene residues in fish from the Tama River near Tokyo, and subsequently in the river water itself, especially at the outlets of sewage treatment plants. This led to a voluntary moratorium on the use of musk xylene in Japan from 1982. Similar residues were subsequently found in European waters such as the Elbe, Stör and Ruhr rivers in Germany, the German Bight area of the North Sea and sewage treatment plant outlets in Sweden. Typical concentrations were >0.001 μg/L in sea water, 0.001–0.01 μg/L in river water and 0.01–0.1 μg/L (sometimes higher) in the effluent from sewage treatment plants.

These findings indicate that musk xylene is not completely removed from wastewater by the sewage treatment process. Two studies in Germany found compared musk xylene concentrations in incoming wastewater and sewage treatment plant effluent, and found removal rates of 82% and 58%. However, they are not concentrations which are expected to be toxic to aquatic life. The European Union Risk Assessment Report reviewed more than a dozen studies of the toxicity of musk xylene to algae and to aquatic vertebrates and invertebrates, and all found no observed effect concentrations greater than 10 μg/L, the chronic aquatic toxicity threshold in the EU REACH Regulation.

The biodegradation of musk xylene in sea water and in mixed sea water/sediment systems was studied in laboratory simulations using carbon-14 labelled musk xylene, and the results discussed in an addendum to the European Union Risk Assessment Report. The half-life in marine sediment was estimated to be 60 days or less, with biodegradation occurring by anaerobic reduction of the nitro groups. The half-life in sediment-free sea water was estimated to be more than 150 days, far above the "very persistent" threshold of 60 days. The 2008 addendum also discussed the photolysis of musk xylene in water and in air, which are rapid: however, photolysis was not considered to be relevant in the persistence of musk xylene in the environment, and was not taken into account in classifying it as a "very persistent" substance.

Several different primary bioaccumulation studies were reviewed in the European Union Risk Assessment Report, with bioaccumulation factors varying between 640 L/kg and 6740 L/kg. Given that musk xylene has a very high octanol–water partition coefficient (log K_{ow} = 4.9), the higher bioaccumulation factors were considered to be the more significant. The 2008 addendum considered a further laboratory study from the Japanese Ministry of International Trade and Industry which was not available to the authors of the original Risk Assessment Report and which also showed bioaccumulation factors in fish (Cyprinus carpio) that were higher than the REACH threshold of 5000 L/kg for "very bioaccumulative" substances. Bioaccumulation factors of more than 5000 L/kg (wet weight basis) have also been found in carp (Carassius carassius) and eels (Anguilla anguilla) from a sewage treatment pond.
