= 4-Fluoronitrobenzene =

Names
- Preferred IUPAC name 1-Fluoro-4-nitrobenzene
- Other names 1-nitro-4-fluorobenzene

Identifiers
CAS Number	350-46-9
3D model (JSmol)	Interactive image
ChEMBL	ChEMBL163729
ChemSpider	13856885
ECHA InfoCard	100.005.912
EC Number	206-502-8
PubChem CID	9590
UNII	A2M2FH7XHH
CompTox Dashboard (EPA)	DTXSID9022025
- InChI: InChI=1S/C6H4FNO2/c7-5-1-3-6(4-2-5)8(9)10/h1-4H Key: WFQDTOYDVUWQMS-UHFFFAOYSA-N
- SMILES: C1=CC(=CC=C1[N+](=O)[O-])F

Properties
Chemical formula	C_{6}H_{4}FNO_{2}
Molar mass	141.101 g·mol^{−1}
Appearance	yellow solid, melting near room temperature
Density	1.340 g/cm^{3}
Melting point	22–24 °C (72–75 °F; 295–297 K)
Boiling point	206 °C (403 °F; 479 K)

Hazards
- GHS labelling
Pictograms	(GHS06: Toxic) (GHS07: Exclamation mark) (GHS08: Health hazard)
Signal word	Danger
Hazard statements	H301, H302, H312, H317, H331, H373, H412
Precautionary statements	P260, P264, P270, P271, P272, P273, P280, P301+P316, P301+P317, P302+P352, P304+P340, P316, P317, P319, P321, P330, P333+P313, P362+P364, P403+P233, P405, P501
- Except where otherwise noted, data are given for materials in their standard state (at 25 °C [77 °F], 100 kPa). Infobox references

4-Fluoronitrobenzene is an organic compound with the formula FC_{6}H_{4}NO_{2}. It is one of three isomeric fluoronitrobenzenes. A yellow oil, it is prepared from 4-nitrochlorobenzene using the Halex process:

O_{2}NC_{6}H_{4}Cl + KF → O_{2}NC_{6}H_{4}F + KCl

4-Fluoronitrobenzene can be hydrogenated to give 4-fluoroaniline, which is a precursor to the fungicide fluoroimide and parafluorofentanyl.

Owing to the presence of the electron withdrawing nitro group, the fluoride is a good leaving group in fluoronitrobenzenes. Thus reaction with phenoxide gives the mononitrodiphenylether.
