= Cashmeran =

Names
- IUPAC name (RS)-1,1,2,3,3-Pentamethyl-1,2,3,5,6,7-hexahydro-4H-inden-4-one

Identifiers
CAS Number	33704-61-9
3D model (JSmol)	Interactive image
ChemSpider	83324
ECHA InfoCard	100.046.940
PubChem CID	92292
UNII	BZR4438MY4
CompTox Dashboard (EPA)	DTXSID8047399
- InChI: InChI=1S/C14H22O/c1-9-13(2,3)10-7-6-8-11(15)12(10)14(9,4)5/h9H,6-8H2,1-5H3 Key: MIZGSAALSYARKU-UHFFFAOYSA-N; InChI=1/C14H22O/c1-9-13(2,3)10-7-6-8-11(15)12(10)14(9,4)5/h9H,6-8H2,1-5H3 Key: MIZGSAALSYARKU-UHFFFAOYAK
- SMILES: CC1C(C2=C(C1(C)C)C(=O)CCC2)(C)C

Properties
Chemical formula	C_{14}H_{22}O
Molar mass	206.329 g·mol^{−1}
Appearance	White solid
Melting point	27 °C (81 °F; 300 K)
Boiling point	256 °C (493 °F; 529 K)
- Except where otherwise noted, data are given for materials in their standard state (at 25 °C [77 °F], 100 kPa). Infobox references

Cashmeran (trade name; also known as musk indanone or indomuscone; chemical name 6,7-dihydro-1,1,2,3,3-pentamethyl-4(5H)-indanone or DPMI) is a chemical compound used in fragrances for its spicy, musk, woody, and clean aroma.

== Physical-chemical properties ==
Cashmeran is an alicyclic ketone with the molecular formula C_{14}H_{22}O and a molecular weight of 206 g/mol. At room temperature it occurs as a white solid but its melting point is 27 °C. Boiling point has been reported to be 256 °C, however in some tests decomposition of the material was noted at 220 °C.

== History ==
Cashmeran was discovered by International Flavors and Fragrances in the 1970s by John Hall. Its invention came about researching inexpensive chemical transformations from ingredients from the pentamethyl indane and tetramethyl naphthalene structures. As a result, Cashmeran, an unsaturated ketone, was identified as an important new fragrance ingredient. Some of the most famous perfumes containing cashmeran are: Black Opium by Yves Saint Laurent, Blanche by Byredo, Bare Vanilla by Victoria's Secret and Good Girl by Carolina Herrera.

== Odour ==
Although cashmeran has been described by some as a polycyclic musk, it is neither primarily a musk odour ingredient, nor does it belong to the polycyclic musk group as defined by the International Fragrance Association (IFRA). The IFRA definition defines a polycyclic musk as:

- Being used primarily and uniquely for their musk odor
- Having a molecular formula of C_{17}H_{24}O or C_{18}H_{26}O, and containing one central aromatic benzene ring.

Although there are woody-musky notes to Cashmeran, its odour is complex with notes that are: rich spicy, fruity, chypre, balsamic and vanilla, overall intended to convey the soft sensuous feeling of cashmere (hence the trade name Cashmeran). As such, cashmeran is used to impart its own characteristic odour, which is completely different from regular musk ingredients. This is further reflected by its typical use level of around 2% compared to for instance the polycyclic musk HHCB (galaxolide) with use levels in fragrances up to 30%. Cashmeran also lacks the aromatic benzene ring structure, which is present throughout the polycyclic musks. Cashmeran should therefore not be categorized as a polycyclic musk.

== Environmental data ==
Cashmeran has a bio concentration factor (BCF) of 156 and an octanol-water partition coefficient (Log K_{ow}) of 4.2, which makes that this material not a very persistent, very bioaccumulative (vPvB), nor a persistent bioaccumulating toxic (PBT) substance. Short term aquatic toxicity for cashmeran is >1 mg/kg for all species (Daphnia, algae and fish). Cashmeran has an environmental hazard classification (R51/53 according to the EU DSD or H411 according to the EU CLP). In this sense, Cashmeran's bio concentration and aquatic toxicity is even an order of magnitude more favourable than those substances considered as polycyclic musks, and therefore also does not meet those criteria for the materials considered to be included in that group.

== Environmental and human monitoring studies ==
Several monitoring studies have been conducted in various environmental compartments and humans. In most studies, DPMI was not detected. Some studies have reported trace levels of DPMI, where the reported levels were below 1 ppm, and typically below 1 ppb. Considering the environmental fate studies, the likelihood of DPMI being present in environmental media is small, and if present, at extremely low levels (i.e. below ppm).

== Human health ==
Cashmeran is a slight skin irritant and an eye irritant (R36/38 according to EU DSD, H315-319 according to EU CLP) and a weak sensitiser (R43/H317) with an EC3 of 33%. Cashmeran is not classified as toxic nor is it a CMR substance
