= Monolinuron =

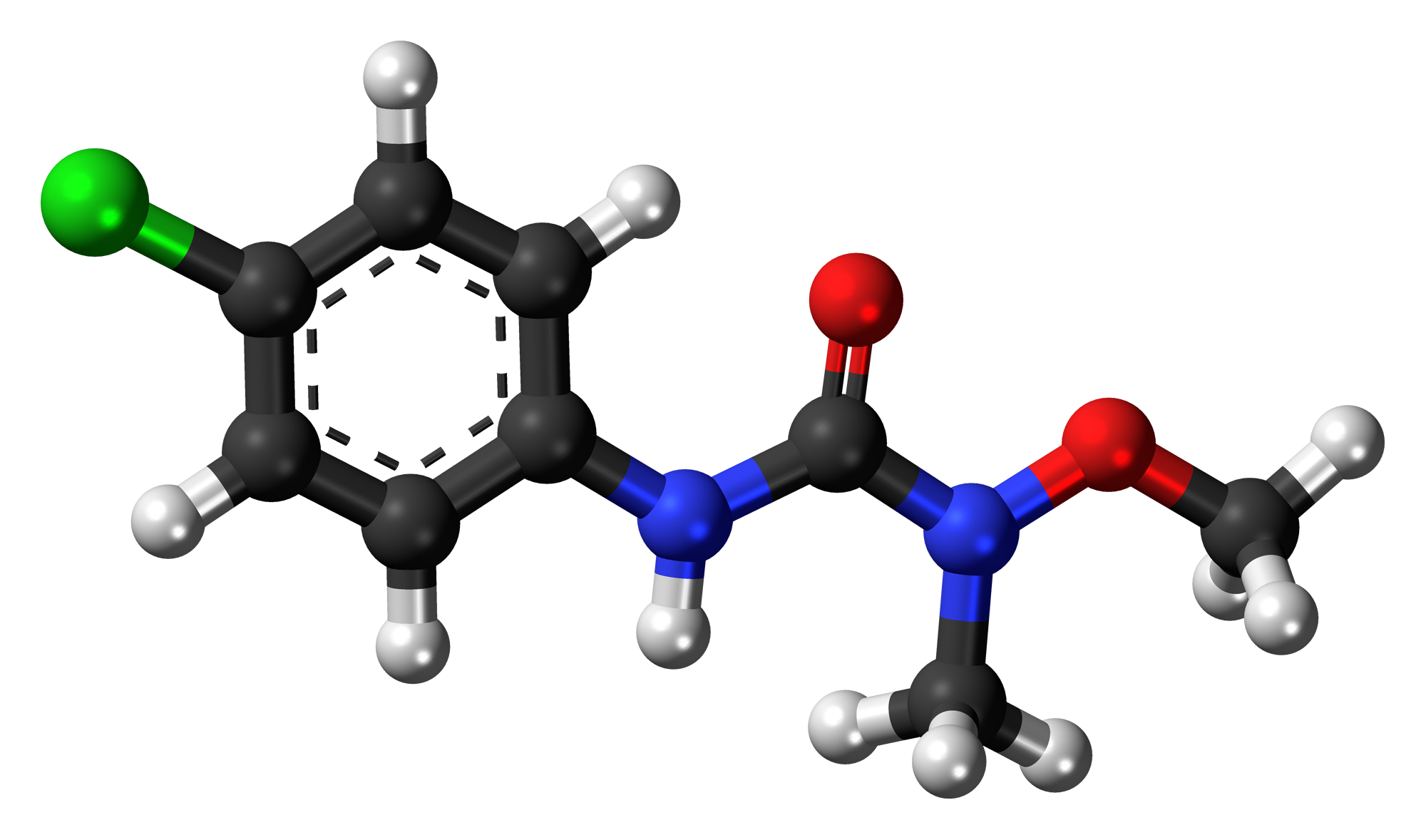

Names
- Preferred IUPAC name N′-(4-Chlorophenyl)-N-methoxy-N-methylurea

Identifiers
CAS Number	1746-81-2
3D model (JSmol)	Interactive image
Beilstein Reference	2212523
ChemSpider	14868
ECHA InfoCard	100.015.572
EC Number	217-129-5
KEGG	C18794
MeSH	Monolinuron
PubChem CID	15629
RTECS number	YS6425000
UNII	6KJJ4XAD6M
CompTox Dashboard (EPA)	DTXSID0037576
- InChI: InChI=1S/C9H11ClN2O2/c1-12(14-2)9(13)11-8-5-3-7(10)4-6-8/h3-6H,1-2H3,(H,11,13) Key: LKJPSUCKSLORMF-UHFFFAOYSA-N
- SMILES: Clc1ccc(NC(=O)N(OC)C)cc1

Properties
Chemical formula	C_{9}H_{11}ClN_{2}O_{2}
Molar mass	214.65 g·mol^{−1}
Melting point	80 to 83 °C (176 to 181 °F; 353 to 356 K)
Solubility in water	0.735 g/L
- Except where otherwise noted, data are given for materials in their standard state (at 25 °C [77 °F], 100 kPa). verify (what is ?) Infobox references

Monolinuron is a pesticide, more specifically a selective systemic herbicide and an algaecide. As an herbicide, it is used to control broad-leaved weeds and annual grasses in vegetable crops such as leeks, potatoes, and dwarf French beans. Monolinuron affects the photosynthesis in weeds. Following uptake of monolinuron through roots and leaves of weeds, monolinuron causes early symptoms of yellowing and die-back of the leaves, eventually resulting in weed death. In fishkeeping, it is used to control blanket weed and hair algae.

Monolinuron's herbicide resistance class is Group C, (Australia), C2 (global), Group 7, (numeric, i.e. Group 5, due to a merger).

As a herbicide, it is used in a range of food and non-food crops, e.g. beans and other vegetables, onions, fruits, cereals, potatoes, vines and ornamental plants. It was introduced to use in circa 1965. It is an inhibitor of photosystem II of photosynthesis. It is a derivative of urea and related to paraquat. It is available under various trade names including Monamex, Gramonol, and Aresin.

It is soluble in water (0.735 g/L), and very soluble in organic solvents (200 g/L in acetone, methanol, and toluene, 3.9 g/L in hexane). Its volatility is low and its leachability is high. It is moderately persistent and moderately mobile in soil, stable in water, and fast degraded in water sediments (DT50 of 22 days). It has low toxicity for mammals (LD_{50} oral for a rat is 2100 mg/kg).
