= 2-Fluoronitrobenzene =

Names
- Preferred IUPAC name 1-Fluoro-2-nitrobenzene
- Other names 2-nitrofluorobenzene

Identifiers
CAS Number	1493-27-2
3D model (JSmol)	Interactive image
ChEMBL	ChEMBL49252
ChemSpider	66528
ECHA InfoCard	100.014.626
EC Number	216-088-0
PubChem CID	73895
UNII	9WUK5DS6YX
CompTox Dashboard (EPA)	DTXSID1061730
- InChI: InChI=1S/C6H4FNO2/c7-5-3-1-2-4-6(5)8(9)10/h1-4H Key: PWKNBLFSJAVFAB-UHFFFAOYSA-N
- SMILES: C1=CC=C(C(=C1)[N+](=O)[O-])F

Properties
Chemical formula	C_{6}H_{4}FNO_{2}
Molar mass	141.101 g·mol^{−1}
Appearance	colorless liquid
Density	1.3291 g/cm^{3}
Melting point	−6 °C (21 °F; 267 K)
Boiling point	215 °C (419 °F; 488 K)
- Except where otherwise noted, data are given for materials in their standard state (at 25 °C [77 °F], 100 kPa). Infobox references

2-Fluoronitrobenzene is an organic compound with the formula FC_{6}H_{4}NO_{2}. It is one of three isomeric fluoronitrobenzenes. A colorless liquid, it is prepared from 2-nitrochlorobenzene using the Halex process:

O_{2}NC_{6}H_{4}Cl + KF → O_{2}NC_{6}H_{4}F + KCl

== Applications ==
2-Fluoronitrobenzene has application in the synthesis of Amoxapine, Olanzapine, an early synthesis of J-113,397, Deschloroclozapine, and 11-Piperazinyl-dibenz[b,f][1,4]oxazepane [21636-40-8].

The closely related compound, 2-chloronitrobenzene is used in the synthesis of quetiapine.
