= 4-(Trifluoromethyl)aniline =

Names
- Preferred IUPAC name 4-(Trifluoromethyl)aniline

Identifiers
| CAS Number | 455-14-1 |
| ECHA InfoCard | 100.006.579 |
| UNII | RQJ623MB8G |
| CompTox Dashboard (EPA) | DTXSID5060013 |

Properties
| Chemical formula | C_{7}H_{6}F_{3}N |
| Molar mass | 161.127 g·mol^{−1} |
| Appearance | colorless solid |
| Density | 1.283 g/cm³ |
| Melting point | 38 °C (100 °F; 311 K) |
| Boiling point | 75 °C (167 °F; 348 K) 1 Torr |
- Except where otherwise noted, data are given for materials in their standard state (at 25 °C [77 °F], 100 kPa). Infobox references

4-(Trifluoromethyl)aniline is an organofluorine compound with the formula CF_{3}C_{6}H_{4}NH_{2}. Three isomers are known, but this isomer is most intensively studied. Its protonated derivative CF_{3}C_{6}H_{4}NH^{+}_{3} has a pK_{a} in acetonitrile of 8.6, about 100x more acidic than aniline. The compound is prepared by reduction of 4-(Trifluoromethyl)nitrobenzene with stannous chloride.

== Related compounds ==
- 3-(Trifluoromethyl)aniline
