= Turning the beat around =

Turning the beat around, abbreviated as TBA in some music textbooks, is a form of temporary tactus or pulse (music) in popular electronic music and electronic dance music. This includes forms of syncopation that issue a challenge to dancers to find the downbeat. In this terminology a "reverse TBA," involves the explicit contradiction of a previously established pulse. The term is to be distinguished from downtempo.

== Examples ==
The concept of turning the beat around can be observed in The Strokes' "Automatic Stop", as well as Passion Pit's "Little Secrets". Both songs begin with a melodic line that leads the listener to perceive the downbeat as being on the first beat of said melodic line, however, when ensuing lines commence, the pulse reveals itself to be elsewhere. The seminal melodies are only then clearly syncopated, relative to the true pulse.
