= 2-Nitrochlorobenzene =

Names
- Preferred IUPAC name 1-Chloro-2-nitrobenzene
- Other names 2-Chloronitrobenzene

Identifiers
CAS Number	88-73-3
3D model (JSmol)	Interactive image
ChEBI	CHEBI:34270
ChEMBL	ChEMBL53330
ChemSpider	13853953
ECHA InfoCard	100.001.686
EC Number	201-854-9
KEGG	C14407
PubChem CID	6945
RTECS number	CZ0875000
UNII	D1YI9R2K8O
UN number	1578
CompTox Dashboard (EPA)	DTXSID0020280
- InChI: InChI=1S/C6H4ClNO2/c7-5-3-1-2-4-6(5)8(9)10/h1-4H Key: BFCFYVKQTRLZHA-UHFFFAOYSA-N; InChI=1/C6H4ClNO2/c7-5-3-1-2-4-6(5)8(9)10/h1-4H Key: BFCFYVKQTRLZHA-UHFFFAOYAA
- SMILES: C1=CC=C(C(=C1)[N+](=O)[O-])Cl

Properties
Chemical formula	C_{6}H_{4}ClNO_{2}
Molar mass	157.55 g·mol^{−1}
Appearance	Yellow crystals
Density	1.368 g/mL
Melting point	33 °C (91 °F; 306 K)
Boiling point	245.5 °C (473.9 °F; 518.6 K)
Solubility in water	Insoluble
Solubility in other solvents	Highly soluble in diethyl ether, benzene, and hot ethanol

Hazards
- Occupational safety and health (OHS/OSH)
Main hazards	Toxic, Irritant
- GHS labelling
Pictograms	(GHS06: Toxic) (GHS07: Exclamation mark) (GHS08: Health hazard) (GHS09: Environmental hazard)
Signal word	Danger
Hazard statements	H301, H302, H311, H312, H317, H331, H332, H350, H351, H361, H372, H411
Precautionary statements	P201, P202, P260, P264, P270, P271, P272, P273, P280, P281, P301+P310, P301+P312, P302+P352, P304+P312, P304+P340, P308+P313, P311, P312, P314, P321, P322, P330, P333+P313, P361, P363, P391, P403+P233, P405, P501
Flash point	124 °C (255 °F; 397 K)
- Except where otherwise noted, data are given for materials in their standard state (at 25 °C [77 °F], 100 kPa). Infobox references

2-Nitrochlorobenzene is an organic compound with the formula ClC_{6}H_{4}NO_{2}. It is one of three isomeric nitrochlorobenzenes. It is a yellow crystalline solid that is important as a precursor to other compounds due to its two functional groups.

== Synthesis ==
Nitrochlorobenzene is typically synthesized by nitration of chlorobenzene in the presence of sulfuric acid:

C_{6}H_{5}Cl + HNO_{3} → O_{2}NC_{6}H_{4}Cl + H_{2}O

This reaction affords a mixture of isomers. Using an acid ratio of 30% nitric acid, 56% sulfuric acid and 14% water, the product mix is typically 34-36% 2-nitrochlorobenzene and 63-65% 4-nitrochlorobenzene, with only about 1% 3-nitrochlorobenzene.

== Reactions ==
2-Nitrochlorobenzene can be reduced to the 2-chloroaniline with Fe/HCl mixture, the Bechamp reduction.

2-Nitrochlorobenzene, like its isomers, is reactive toward nucleophiles, resulting in chloride substitution. With polysulfide, it reacts to give di-orthonitrophenyl disulfide:

2 O_{2}NC_{6}H_{4}Cl + Na_{2}S_{2} → (O_{2}NC_{6}H_{4}S)_{2} + 2 NaCl

Similarly, it reacts with sodium methoxide to give 2-nitroanisole.

Substitution of chloride by fluoride is also practiced commercially to convert 2-nitrochlorobenzene to 2-fluoronitrobenzene. The Halex process uses potassium fluoride in polar solvents like sulfolane :

O_{2}NC_{6}H_{4}Cl + KF → O_{2}NC_{6}H_{4}F + KCl

== Applications ==
2-Nitrochlorobenzene is useful because both of its reactive sites can be utilized to create further compounds that are mutually ortho. Its derivative 2-chloroaniline is a precursor to 3,3’-dichlorobenzidine, a precursor to dyes and pesticides.

Some of the recognized uses of 2-nitrochlorobenzene include in the synthesis loxapine, quetiapine, amoxapine, clotiapine, metiapine & methopromazine.
