= Fluoronitrobenzene =

Fluoronitrobenzene may refer to three compounds with the formula FC_{6}H_{4}NO_{2}:

- 2-Fluoronitrobenzene
- 3-Fluoronitrobenzene
- 4-Fluoronitrobenzene
