= Anilofos =

Herbicide active ingredient

Names
- IUPAC name S-4-chloro-N-isopropylcarbaniloylmethyl-O, O-dimethylphosphorodithioate
- Other names Anilophos, Arozin

Identifiers
CAS Number	64249-01-0
3D model (JSmol)	Interactive image
ChEBI	CHEBI:81728
ChemSpider	82790
ECHA InfoCard	100.058.851
EC Number	264-756-5
KEGG	C18394
PubChem CID	91687
UNII	71W48U40S6
CompTox Dashboard (EPA)	DTXSID5058149
- InChI: InChI=1S/C13H19ClNO3PS2/c1-10(2)15(12-7-5-11(14)6-8-12)13(16)9-21-19(20,17-3)18-4/h5-8,10H,9H2,1-4H3 Key: NXQDBZGWYSEGFL-UHFFFAOYSA-N
- SMILES: CC(C)N(C1=CC=C(C=C1)Cl)C(=O)CSP(=S)(OC)OC

Properties
Chemical formula	C_{13}H_{19}ClNO_{3}PS_{2}
Molar mass	367.84 g·mol^{−1}
Appearance	white-to-brown solid
Density	1.322 t/m^{3}
Melting point	51 °C (124 °F; 324 K)
Boiling point	444 °C (831 °F; 717 K)
Solubility in water	9.4 mg/L
Solubility in acetone	>700 g/L
Solubility in chloroform	>700 g/L
Solubility in toluene	>700 g/L
Vapor pressure	2.2 mPa

Hazards
- Occupational safety and health (OHS/OSH)
Main hazards	Acute oral toxicity, irritation
- GHS labelling
Pictograms	(GHS07: Exclamation mark)
Signal word	Warning
Hazard statements	H302
Precautionary statements	P264, P270, P301+P317, P330, P501
Flash point	221°C, 430°F
- Lethal dose or concentration (LD, LC)
LD_{50} (median dose)	472 mg/kg (rat, oral); >2000 mg/kg (rabbit, dermal)
LC_{50} (median concentration)	26 g/m^{3} (rat, inhalation, 4 hr); 2.8 mg/L (trout, 96 hr)
- Except where otherwise noted, data are given for materials in their standard state (at 25 °C [77 °F], 100 kPa). Infobox references

Anilofos, or anilophos, is an organophosphorus, anilide herbicide, used as a pre- or post-emergent selective herbicide to control annual grassy weeds and sedges in transplanted rice. It is used in India. It was brought to market circa 1980.

== Usage ==
Anilophos's herbicide resistance classification is group K (Australia), K3 (global), or 15 (numeric), which is the inhibition of very long chain fatty acid synthesis. It is absorbed though roots and to some extent through newly emerging shoots and young leaves. It acts on meristematic tissue to affect cell division and elongation, producing discolouration, stunted growth and death.

Anilofos is not approved in the European Union under Regulation No. 1107/2009. It controls Indian goosegrass, barnyard grass, flatsedge, yellow nutsedge and cockspur. It is used on rice, paddy and soybean.

Formulations of anilophos have been sold under the tradenames Arrozin, Ricozin, Aniloguard, Shoot and Anilo-Tox, which are usually sold as emulsifiable concentrates, granules or dispersible powders. In India, they are applied at 300 to 350 grams per hectare active ingredient. Anilofos is adsorbed initially on the plant's surface and slowly by intracellular uptake.

Forumations in India are sold as 18% or 30% emulsifiable concentrates. 631 tonnes (1,391,000 lb) was used in 2007, 2.6% of India's total herbicide usage.

== Properties ==
Anilophos is lipophilic. Organophosphorus lipophilics interact strongly with cell membrane phospholipid, such as chlorpyrifos, an insecticide with this site of action.

Anilofos is chemically stable under standard conditions, but under intense heating may form an explodable mixture with air. It has low volatility. Anilofos is soluble in acetone, chloroform and toluene, to over 700 g/L, and in benzene, dichloromethane, ethanol, ethyl acetate to 53 g/L, hexane to 7.4 g/L. It is insoluble in water.

Anilofos is a thiono organophosphate.

== Environmental behaviour ==
Anilofos is moderately persistent in soil, with a half-life of about 38 days, although in flooded soil it dissipates faster, in 5 to 25 days. It doesn't bioaccumulate in soil and shows no tendency for groundwater leaching. The water half-life is also short. It is not toxic to birds, with an LD50 over 3360 mg/kg, though the LD50 for bees via contact is 5.9μg, moderately toxic.

== Safety ==
There is evidence that anilofos is a neurotoxin, that it inhibits acetyl cholinesterase and that it irritates the skin and respiratory tract.

== Links ==
- Anilofos in the Pesticide Properties DataBase (PPDB)
- Anilofos on AgData
