= 4-Fluoroaniline =

Organofluorine compound and liquid

Names
- Preferred IUPAC name 4-Fluoroaniline
- Other names p-Fluoroaniline

Identifiers
| CAS Number | 371-40-4 |
| 3D model (JSmol) | Interactive image |
| ChEBI | CHEBI:28546 |
| ChEMBL | ChEMBL32014 |
| ChemSpider | 9349 |
| ECHA InfoCard | 100.006.123 |
| EC Number | 206-735-5 |
| KEGG | C11014 |
| PubChem CID | 9731 |
| UNII | 60HI1G076Z |
| UN number | 2941 |
| CompTox Dashboard (EPA) | DTXSID9022027 |
- InChI: InChI=1S/C6H6FN/c7-5-1-3-6(8)4-2-5/h1-4H,8H2 Key: KRZCOLNOCZKSDF-UHFFFAOYSA-N
- SMILES: C1=CC(=CC=C1N)F

Properties
| Chemical formula | C_{6}H_{6}FN |
| Molar mass | 111.119 g·mol^{−1} |
| Appearance | colorless liquid |
| Density | 1.1725 g/cm^{3} |
| Melting point | −1.9 °C (28.6 °F; 271.2 K) |
| Boiling point | 188 °C (370 °F; 461 K) |

Hazards
- GHS labelling
| Pictograms | (GHS05: Corrosive) (GHS07: Exclamation mark) (GHS08: Health hazard) (GHS09: Environmental hazard) |
| Signal word | Danger |
| Hazard statements | H302, H312, H314, H315, H317, H319, H332, H372, H373, H410, H411 |
| Precautionary statements | P260, P264, P264+P265, P270, P271, P272, P273, P280, P301+P317, P301+P330+P331, P302+P352, P302+P361+P354, P304+P340, P305+P351+P338, P305+P354+P338, P316, P317, P319, P321, P330, P332+P317, P333+P313, P337+P317, P362+P364, P363, P391, P405, P501 |
- Except where otherwise noted, data are given for materials in their standard state (at 25 °C [77 °F], 100 kPa). Infobox references

4-Fluoroaniline is an organofluorine compound with the formula FC_{6}H_{4}NH_{2}. A colorless liquid, it is one of three isomers of fluoroaniline. 4-Fluoroaniline can be prepared by the hydrogenation of 4-nitrofluorobenzene.

== Applications ==
It is a common building block in medicinal chemistry and related fields. For example, it is a precursor to the fungicide fluoroimide or the fentanyl analogue parafluorofentanyl. It has also been evaluated for the production of ligands for homogeneous catalysis.

Other common uses include in the synthesis of SCH-57871 (the precursor to ezetimibe), difloxacin, basimglurant, revaprazan & in one of the many fluoresone syntheses.
