= Fluoroaniline =

Fluoroaniline may refer to three compounds with the formula FC_{6}H_{4}NH_{2}:

- 2-Fluoroaniline
- 3-Fluoroaniline
- 4-Fluoroaniline
