= 3-(Trifluoromethyl)aniline =

Names
- Preferred IUPAC name 3-(Trifluoromethyl)aniline
- Other names 3-Aminobenzotrifluoride; m-ABTF; m-Trifluoromethylaniline, 3-(Trifluoromethyl)phenyl-1-amine

Identifiers
CAS Number	98-16-8
3D model (JSmol)	Interactive image
ChEMBL	ChEMBL1162293
ChemSpider	7097
ECHA InfoCard	100.002.404
PubChem CID	7375
UNII	Z1RWM538YN
CompTox Dashboard (EPA)	DTXSID9024512
- InChI: InChI=1S/C7H6F3N/c8-7(9,10)5-2-1-3-6(11)4-5/h1-4H,11H2 Key: VIUDTWATMPPKEL-UHFFFAOYSA-N; InChI=1/C7H6F3N/c8-7(9,10)5-2-1-3-6(11)4-5/h1-4H,11H2 Key: VIUDTWATMPPKEL-UHFFFAOYAM
- SMILES: FC(F)(F)c1cc(N)ccc1

Properties
Chemical formula	C_{7}H_{6}F_{3}N
Molar mass	161.12 g/mol
Appearance	colorless liquid
Density	1.29 g/cm^{3}
Melting point	5 to 6 °C (41 to 43 °F; 278 to 279 K)
Boiling point	187 to 188 °C (369 to 370 °F; 460 to 461 K)
- Except where otherwise noted, data are given for materials in their standard state (at 25 °C [77 °F], 100 kPa). verify (what is ?) Infobox references

3-(Trifluoromethyl)aniline is an organic compound with the formula CF_{3}C_{6}H_{4}NH_{2}. It is one of three isomers of trifluoromethylaniline. The corresponding N,N-dimethyl derivative is also known.

== Applications ==
3-Aminobenzotrifluoride is a versatile chemical intermediate with applications in the synthesis of the following list of compounds: 1. Atovaquone, 2. Colfenamate, 3. Etofenamate, 4. Floctafenine, 5. Flufenamic acid, 6. HT-2157, 7. Losulazine, 8. Morniflumate, 9. Niflumic acid, 10. Norflurazon, 11. Pentflutizide, 12. Prefenamate, 13. Salfluverine, 14. Talniflumate, 15. Triflocin, 16. Ticarbodine, 17. Ufenamate.

In addition, 3-aminobenzotrifluoride is used to synthesize 2-trifluoromethylphenothiazine [92-30-8]. This is used to synthesize: 1. Duoperone, 2. Homofenazine, 3. Trifluoperazine, 4. Oxaflumazine, 5. Fluacizine, 6. Trifluomeprazine, 7. Ciclofenazine.

4-Chloro-7-(trifluoromethyl)quinoline [346-55-4] is used to synthesize: 1. Antrafenine, 2. Antihyperquine, 3. Trifluoroquine [442-85-3], 4. EHT-1864, 5. Florifenine, 6. Losulazine.

== Related compounds ==
- 4-(Trifluoromethyl)aniline
