= 2,4,6-Trichloroaniline =

Chemical compound

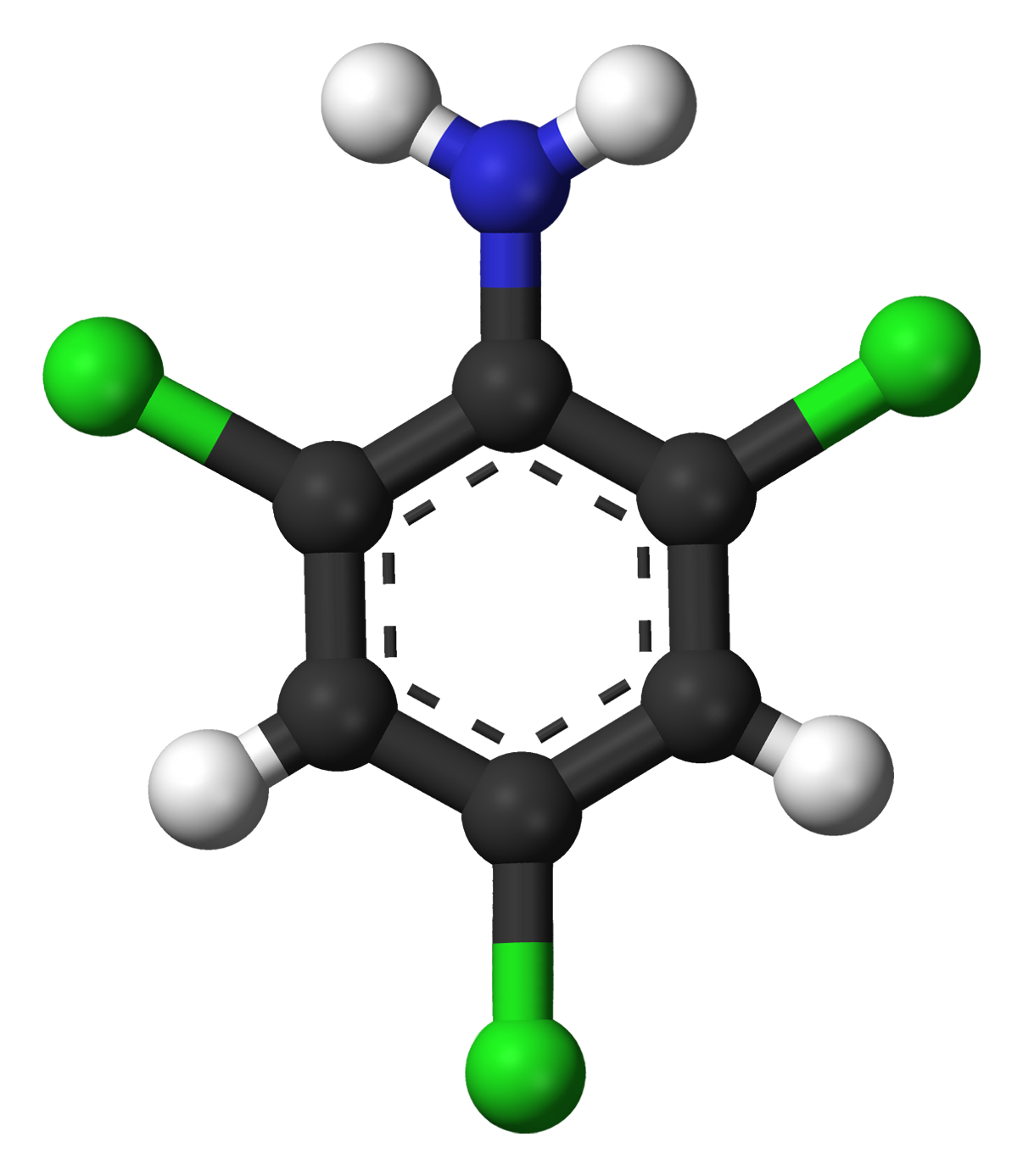
The ball-and-stick model of 2,4,6-trichloroaniline
The structure of 2,4,6-trichloroaniline

Names
- Preferred IUPAC name 2,4,6-Trichloroaniline

Identifiers
CAS Number	634-93-5
3D model (JSmol)	Interactive image
ChEMBL	ChEMBL1894620
ChemSpider	11961
ECHA InfoCard	100.010.200
EC Number	211-219-8
PubChem CID	12471
UNII	J7IC72N9B0
UN number	2811
CompTox Dashboard (EPA)	DTXSID6021379
- InChI: InChI=1S/C6H4Cl3N/c7-3-1-4(8)6(10)5(9)2-3/h1-2H,10H2 Key: NATVSFWWYVJTAZ-UHFFFAOYSA-N
- SMILES: C1=C(C=C(C(=C1Cl)N)Cl)Cl

Properties
Chemical formula	C_{6}H_{4}Cl_{3}N
Molar mass	196.46 g·mol^{−1}
Appearance	Long needles or fine, light purple fibers
Melting point	78.5 °C (173.3 °F; 351.6 K)
Boiling point	262 °C (504 °F; 535 K)
Solubility in water	40 mg/L
Solubility	chloroform, ether, ethanol
log P	3.69
Vapor pressure	1.47×10^{−7} mmHg
Acidity (pK_{a})	0.07 (for the conjugate acid)
Basicity (pK_{b})	13.93

Hazards
- Occupational safety and health (OHS/OSH)
Main hazards	Harmful, corrosive, toxic
- GHS labelling
Pictograms	(GHS06: Toxic) (GHS07: Exclamation mark) (GHS08: Health hazard) (GHS09: Environmental hazard)
Signal word	Danger
Hazard statements	H301, H311, H317, H331, H373, H410, H411
Precautionary statements	P260, P264, P270, P271, P272, P273, P280, P301+P310, P302+P352, P304+P340, P311, P312, P314, P321, P322, P330, P333+P313, P361, P363, P391, P403+P233, P405, P501
NFPA 704 (fire diamond)	3 1 0
Flash point	110 °C (230 °F; 383 K)
Autoignition temperature	Decomposes
- Lethal dose or concentration (LD, LC)
LD_{50} (median dose)	2400 mg/kg (rat, oral)
- Except where otherwise noted, data are given for materials in their standard state (at 25 °C [77 °F], 100 kPa). Infobox references

2,4,6-Trichloroaniline is a chemical compound with a formula of C_{6}H_{4}Cl_{3}N. It is useful as an intermediate in chemical reactions.

== Preparation ==
2,4,6-Trichloroaniline can be prepared by reaction of dry aniline with chlorine gas while in an anhydrous solution of carbon tetrachloride. 2,4,6-Trichloroaniline precipitates from solution as a white solid. In the presence of water in the solution the white material will be contaminated with aniline black.

Aniline

Cl_{2}
CCl_{4}

2,4,6-Trichloroaniline

+ 3 HCl
The preparation of 2,4,6-trichloroaniline

== Safety ==
Occupational exposure to 2,4,6-trichloroaniline may occur through inhalation and dermal contact with this compound at workplaces where 2,4,6-trichloroaniline is produced or used (SRC). The general population may be exposed to 2,4,6-trichloroaniline via drinking water and dermal contact with this compound in dyestuffs, pigments, and pesticides containing 2,4,6-trichloroaniline. 2,4,6-trichloroaniline can be toxic when inhaled or ingested orally. The lethal dose is 2400 mg/kg for a rat.

Upon heating, 2,4,6-trichloroaniline will not undergo combustion, but may release hydrogen chloride, nitrogen oxides or carbon monoxide.
