= Chloroaniline =

Chloroaniline may refer to any of three isomeric chemical compounds:

- 2-Chloroaniline
- 3-Chloroaniline
- 4-Chloroaniline
