= 3-Nitrochlorobenzene =

Names
- Preferred IUPAC name 1-Chloro-3-nitrobenzene
- Other names m-Nitrochlorobenzene; m-Chloronitrobenzene; 3-Chloronitrobenzene

Identifiers
CAS Number	121-73-3
3D model (JSmol)	Interactive image
ChemSpider	21106013
ECHA InfoCard	100.004.088
EC Number	204-496-1
PubChem CID	8489
UNII	8XSA3GF8O1
CompTox Dashboard (EPA)	DTXSID4021971
- InChI: InChI=1S/C6H4ClNO2/c7-5-2-1-3-6(4-5)8(9)10/h1-4H Key: KMAQZIILEGKYQZ-UHFFFAOYSA-N; InChI=1/C6H4ClNO2/c7-5-2-1-3-6(4-5)8(9)10/h1-4H Key: KMAQZIILEGKYQZ-UHFFFAOYAS
- SMILES: C1=CC(=CC(=C1)Cl)[N+](=O)[O-]

Properties
Chemical formula	C_{6}H_{4}ClNO_{2}
Molar mass	157.55 g·mol^{−1}
Appearance	Pale yellow crystals
Density	1.534 g/mL
Melting point	43 to 47 °C (109 to 117 °F; 316 to 320 K)
Boiling point	236 °C (457 °F; 509 K)
Solubility in water	Insoluble
Solubility in benzene, ether, hot ethanol, and acetone	Soluble

Hazards
- Occupational safety and health (OHS/OSH)
Main hazards	Toxic
- Except where otherwise noted, data are given for materials in their standard state (at 25 °C [77 °F], 100 kPa). Infobox references

3-Nitrochlorobenzene is an organic compound with the formula C_{6}H_{4}ClNO_{2}. It is a yellow crystalline solid that is important as a precursor to other compounds due to the two reactive sites present on the molecule.

== Synthesis ==
Nitrochlorobenzene is typically synthesized by nitration of chlorobenzene in the presence of sulfuric acid:

C_{6}H_{5}Cl + HNO_{3} → O_{2}NC_{6}H_{4}Cl + H_{2}O

This reaction affords a mixture of isomers. Using an acid ratio of 30/56/14, the product mix is typically 34-36% 2-nitrochlorobenzene and 63-65% 4-nitrochlorobenzene, with only about 1% 3-nitrochlorobenzene.

Since the above synthetic route does not efficiently produce the 3-isomer, the route most commonly used by chemists is the chlorination of nitrobenzene. This reaction must be carried out with a sublimed iron(III) catalyst at 33-45 °C.

Purification of 3-nitrochlorobenzene is somewhat difficult since other isomers are formed even via chlorination of nitrobenzene, and all of these isomers have similar physical properties. Hydrolysis at the activated chlorine site of the 2- and 4-isomers (but not at the resistant 3-chlorine center) makes separation by physical means much less tedious.

== Reactions ==
Unlike the other isomers of nitrochlorobenzene, the meta isomer is not activated to nucleophilic substitution at the chlorine center. However, 3-nitrochlorobenzene has other interesting reactivity. 3-Nitrochlorobenzene can be reduced to 3-chloroaniline with Fe/HCl mixture, the Bechamp reduction. Electrophilic aromatic substitution is possible on 3-nitrochlorobenzene, yielding many possible products.

== Applications ==
3-Nitrochlorobenzene is not useful itself but is a precursor to other useful compounds. Its derivative 3-chloroaniline, a useful compound sometimes referred to as Orange GC Base.
