= 4-Nitrochlorobenzene =

4-nitrochlorobenzene
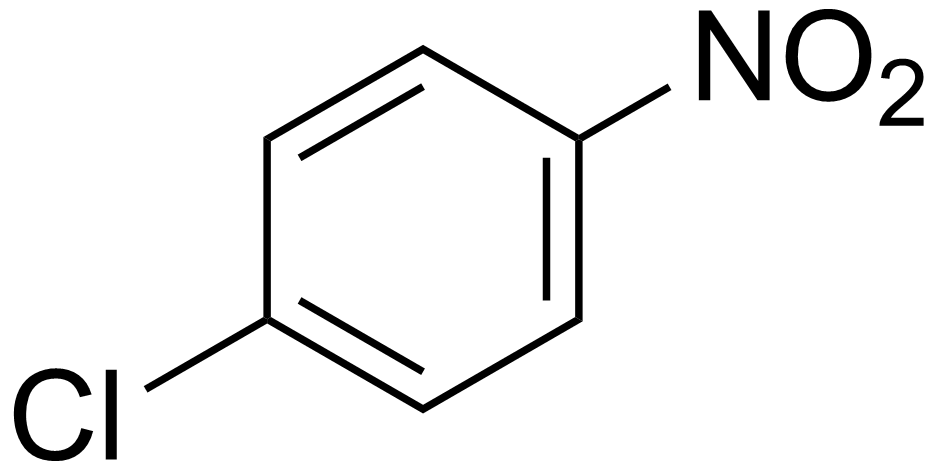

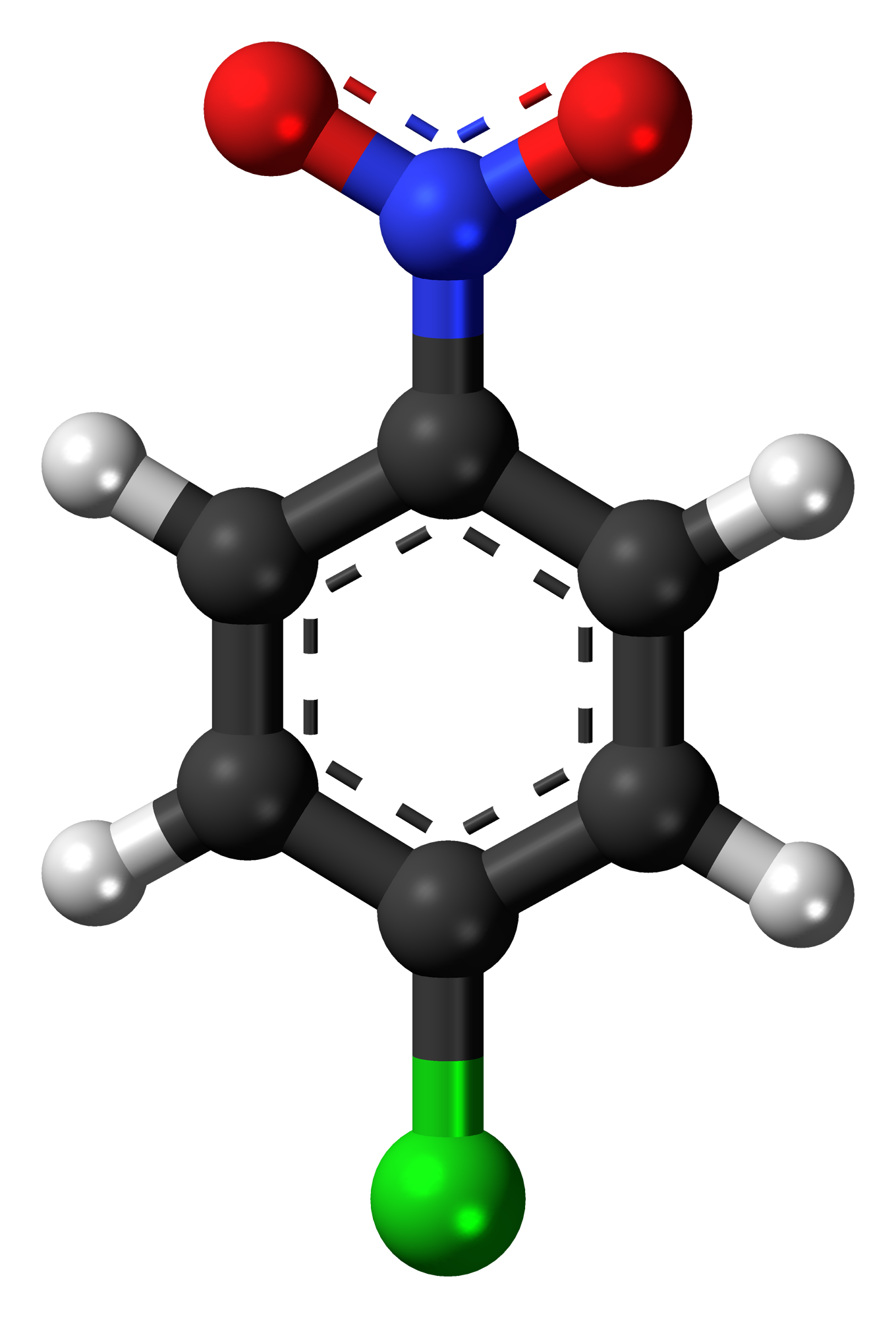

Names
- Preferred IUPAC name 1-Chloro-4-nitrobenzene
- Other names 4-Chloro-1-nitrobenzene; 4-Chloronitrobenzene p-Nitrochlorobenzene; PNCBO

Identifiers
CAS Number	100-00-5
3D model (JSmol)	Interactive image
ChemSpider	21106020
ECHA InfoCard	100.002.554
KEGG	C14456
PubChem CID	7474
UNII	CVL66U249D
CompTox Dashboard (EPA)	DTXSID5020281
- InChI: InChI=1S/C6H4ClNO2/c7-5-1-3-6(4-2-5)8(9)10/h1-4H Key: CZGCEKJOLUNIFY-UHFFFAOYSA-N; InChI=1/C6H4ClNO2/c7-5-1-3-6(4-2-5)8(9)10/h1-4H Key: CZGCEKJOLUNIFY-UHFFFAOYAO
- SMILES: C1=CC(=CC=C1[N+](=O)[O-])Cl

Properties
Chemical formula	C_{6}H_{4}ClNO_{2}
Molar mass	157.55 g·mol^{−1}
Appearance	Light yellow solid
Odor	sweet
Density	1.52 g/cm^{3} (20 °C)
Melting point	83.6 °C (182.5 °F; 356.8 K)
Boiling point	242.0 °C (467.6 °F; 515.1 K)
Solubility in water	Insoluble
Solubility in other solvents	Soluble in toluene, ether, acetone, hot ethanol
Vapor pressure	0.2 mmHg (30°C)

Hazards
Flash point	12 °C (54 °F; 285 K)
- Lethal dose or concentration (LD, LC)
LD_{50} (median dose)	812 mg/kg (rat, oral); 1414 mg/kg (mouse, oral); 440 mg/kg (mouse, oral); 420 mg/kg (rat, oral)
LC_{50} (median concentration)	164 mg/m^{3} (cat, 7 hr)
- NIOSH (US health exposure limits)
PEL (Permissible)	TWA 1 mg/m^{3} [skin]
REL (Recommended)	Ca
IDLH (Immediate danger)	Ca [100 mg/m^{3}]
Safety data sheet (SDS)	External MSDS
- Except where otherwise noted, data are given for materials in their standard state (at 25 °C [77 °F], 100 kPa). verify (what is ?) Infobox references

4-Nitrochlorobenzene is the organic compound with the formula ClC_{6}H_{4}NO_{2}. It is a pale yellow solid. 4-Nitrochlorobenzene is a common intermediate in the production of a number of industrially useful compounds, including antioxidants commonly found in rubber. Other isomers with the formula ClC_{6}H_{4}NO_{2} include 2-nitrochlorobenzene and 3-nitrochlorobenzene.

== Preparation and reactions ==
4-Nitrochlorobenzene is prepared industrially by nitration of chlorobenzene:

ClC_{6}H_{5} + HNO_{3} → ClC_{6}H_{4}NO_{2} + H_{2}O

This reaction affords both the 2- and the 4-nitro derivatives, in about a 1:2 ratio. These isomers are separated by a combination of crystallization and distillation. 4-Nitrochlorobenzene was originally prepared by the nitration of 4-bromochlorobenzene by Holleman and coworkers.

The chloride substituent in 4-nitrochlorobenzene is more labile than in chlorobenzene. For example, it is readily displaced by sulfide nucleophiles, leading the way to 4-nitrothiophenol. In another example, 4-nitrochlorobenzene is a favored substrate for cross-coupling reactions.

== Applications ==
4-Nitrochlorobenzene is an intermediate in the preparation of a variety of derivatives. Nitration gives 2,4-dinitrochlorobenzene, and 3,4-dichloronitrobenzene. Reduction with iron metal gives 4-chloroaniline. The electron-withdrawing nature of the appended nitro-group makes the benzene ring especially susceptible to nucleophilic aromatic substitution, unlike related chlorobenzene. Thus, the strong nucleophiles hydroxide, methoxide, fluoride, and amide displace chloride to give respectively 4-nitrophenol, 4-nitroanisole, 4-fluoronitrobenzene, and 4-nitroaniline.

Another use of 4-nitrochlorobenzene is its condensation with aniline to produce 4-nitrodiphenylamine. Reductive alkylation of the nitro group affords secondary aryl amines, which are useful antioxidants for rubber.

4-Nitrochlorobenzene is the precursor to the anti-leprosy drug Dapsone (4-[(4-aminobenzene)sulfonyl]aniline).

== Safety ==
The U.S. National Institute for Occupational Safety and Health considers 4-nitrochlorobenzene as a potential occupational carcinogen. The Occupational Safety and Health Administration set a permissible exposure limit of 1 mg/m^{3} The American Conference of Governmental Industrial Hygienists recommends an airborne exposure limit of 0.64 mg/m^{3} over a time-weighted average of eight hours.
