= Hypervalent organoiodine compounds =

Organic derivative of iodine

Unlike its lighter congeners, the halogen iodine forms a number of stable organic compounds, in which iodine exhibits higher formal oxidation states than −1 or coordination number exceeding 1. These are loosely termed the hypervalent organoiodines (strictly, this requires an electron count exceeding 8 around iodine and the presence of a carbon–iodine covalent bond). More generally, these iodine compounds are called iodanes, as covalent derivatives of iodine (of any type) are referred to in IUPAC nomenclature.

These iodine compounds are hypervalent because the iodine atom formally contains in its valence shell more than the 8 electrons required for the octet rule. Hypervalent iodine oxyanions are known for oxidation states +1, +3, +5, and +7; organic analogues of these moieties are known for each oxidation state except +7.

In terms of chemical behavior, λ^{3}‑ and λ^{5}‑iodanes are generally oxidizing and/or electrophilic species. They have been widely applied towards those ends in organic synthesis.

== Nomenclature ==
Several different naming conventions are in use for the hypervalent organoiodines.

All begin with oxidation state assignments using a slightly non-standard convention. In iodane chemistry, carbon is considered more electronegative than iodine, despite the commonly given Pauling electronegativities of those respective atoms. Thus iodobenzene (C_{6}H_{5}I) is an iodine(I) compound, (dichloroiodo)benzene (C_{6}H_{5}ICl_{2}) and iodosobenzene (C_{6}H_{5}IO) iodine(III) compounds, and iodoxybenzene (C_{6}H_{5}IO_{2}) an iodine(V) compound.

With that convention in place, IUPAC names assume complete electron transfer. Thus when iodine is ligated to an organic residue and two electronegative groups, it is in the +3 oxidation state and the corresponding compound is a λ^{3}‑iodane. A compound with iodine(V) would be a λ^{5}‑iodane, and a hypothetical iodine(VII)‑containing compound would be a λ^{7}‑iodane. A compound of type ROI (e.g., CH_{3}COOI), formally a λ^{1}‑iodane, is sometimes called an organic hypoiodite (high oxidation state iodine, although these compounds are not organoiodine [no C–I bond] and neither hypervalent nor hypercoordinate).

Alternatively, the hypervalent iodines can be classified using neutral electron counting. Iodine itself contains 7 valence electrons, and, in a monovalent iodane such as iodobenzene (C_{6}H_{5}I), the phenyl ligand donates one additional electron to give a completed octet. In a λ^{3}‑iodane, each X-type ligand donates an additional electron, for 10 in total; the result is a decet structure. Similarly, many λ^{5}‑iodanes are dodecet molecules, and hypothetical λ^{7}‑iodanes are tetradecet molecules. As with other hypervalent compounds, N‑X‑L notation can be used to describe the formal electron count of iodanes, in which N stands for the number of electrons around the central atom X (in this case iodine), and L is the total number of ligand bonds with X. Thus, λ^{3}‑iodanes can be described as 10‑I‑3 compounds, λ^{5}‑iodanes as 12‑I‑5 compounds, and hypothetical λ^{7}‑iodanes as 14‑I‑7 compounds.

== Electron structure ==
As with other hypervalent compounds, iodanes bonding was formerly described using d-orbital participation. 3-center-4-electron bonding is now believed to be the primary bonding mode. This paradigm was developed by J.J. Musher in 1969.

One such bond exists in iodine(III) compounds, two such bonds reside in iodine(V) compounds and three such bonds would reside in the hypothetical iodine(VII) compounds.

== Examples ==
Hypervalent organoiodine compounds are prepared by the oxidation of an organyl iodide.

In 1886, German chemist Conrad Willgerodt prepared the first hypervalent iodine compound, iodobenzene dichloride (PhICl_{2}), by passing chlorine gas through iodobenzene in a cooled solution of chloroform:

PhI + Cl_{2} → PhICl_{2}

This preparation can be varied to produce iodobenzene pseudohalides. Cleaner preparations begin with solutions of peracetic acid in glacial acetic acid, also due to Willgerodt:

C_{6}H_{5}I + CH_{3}C(O)OOH + CH_{3}COOH → C_{6}H_{5}I(OC(O)CH_{3})_{2} + H_{2}O

The iodobenzene diacetate product hydrolyzes to the polymeric iodosobenzene (PhIO), which is stable in cool alkaline solution. In hot water (or, in Willgerodt's original preparation, steam distillation), iodosobenzene instead disproportionates to iodoxybenzene and iodobenzene:

2 PhIO → PhIO_{2} + PhI

2-Iodobenzoic acid reacts with oxone or a combination of potassium bromate and sulfuric acid to produce the insoluble λ^{5}‑iodane 2-iodoxybenzoic (IBX) acid. IBX acid is unstable and explosive, but acetylation tempers it to the stabler Dess-Martin periodinane.

Aliphatic hypoiodites can be synthesized through a variant on the Williamson ether synthesis: an alkoxide reacts with iodine monochloride, releasing the alkyl hypoiodite and chloride. Alternatively, the Meyer-Hartmann reaction applies: a silver alkoxide reacts with elemental iodine to give the hypoiodite and silver iodide. They are unstable to visible light, cleaving into alkoxyl and iodine radicals.

The synthesis of organyl periodyl derivatives (λ^{7}-iodanes) has been attempted since the early 20th century. Efforts so far have met with failure, although aryl λ^{7}‑chloranes are known. Organic diesters of iodine(VII) are presumed intermediates in the periodate cleavage of diols (Malaprade reaction), although no carbon-iodine(VII) bond is present in this process.

== Diaryliodonium salts ==
Diaryliodonium salts are compounds of the type [Ar−I^{+}−Ar]X^{−}. Considered as ionic compounds, they are 8-I-2 and not technically hypervalent. However, this formal view that they are composed of a diaryliodonium cation paired with a counteranion does not reflect structural reality, in which crystal structures universally show a long, weak, partially-covalent bond between the iodine and the counterion. Some authors have described this interaction as an example of halogen bonding, but the interaction exists even with traditionally noncoordinating ions, such as perchlorate, triflate, or tetrafluoroborate. As a result, many authors regard the diaryliodonia as more properly described as 10-I-3 hypervalent λ^{3}-iodanes.

The salts are generally T-shaped, with the counteranion occupying an apical position. The overall geometry at the iodine atom is pseudotrigonal bipyramidal. The placement of ligands exhibits apicophilicity: the phenyl group and electronegative group attain apical positions, while the other phenyl group and two lone pairs of electrons hold equatorial ones.

Salts with a halide counterion are poorly soluble in many organic solvents, possibly because the halides bridge dimers. Solubility improves with triflate and tetrafluoroborate counterions.

In general, the salts can be prepared from preformed hypervalent iodines such as iodic acid, iodosyl sulfate or iodosyl triflate. The first such compound was synthesised in 1894, via the silver hydroxide-catalyzed coupling of two aryl iodides (the Meyer–Hartmann reaction):

Alternatively, the iodane may be formed in situ: an aryl iodide is oxidized to an aryliodine(III) compound (such as ArIO), followed by a ligand exchange. The latter can occur with organometallized arenes such as an arylstannane or -silane or unfunctionalized arenes in the presence of a Brønsted or Lewis acid (an electrophilic aromatic substitution reaction).

Diaryliodonium salts react with nucleophiles at iodine, replacing one ligand to form the substituted arene ArNu and iodobenzene ArI. Diaryliodonium salts also react with metals M through ArMX intermediates in cross-coupling reactions.

== Uses ==
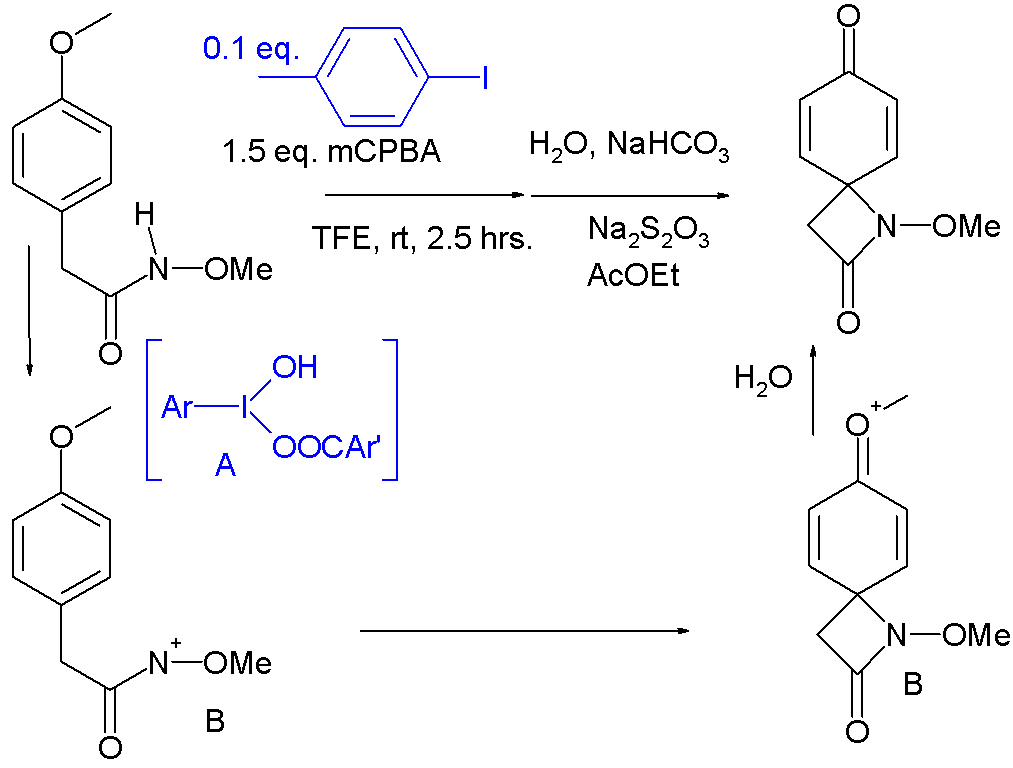
Sacrificial catalyst mCPBA oxidizes an aryliodide reagent to iodine(III) intermediate A. A in turn converts the hydroxylamine group to a nitrenium ion, B. The nitrenium is performs electrophilic ipso addition to the aromatic ring, forming an enonic lactam.

Hypervalent iodine compounds are predominantly used as oxidizing reagents, although they are specialized and expensive. In some cases they replace more toxic oxidants.

Iodobenzene diacetate (PhI(OAc)_{2}) and iodobenzene di(trifluoroacetate) are both strong oxidizing agents used in organic oxidations, as well as precursors for further organoiodine compounds. A hypervalent iodine (III) reagent was used as oxidant, together with ammonium acetate as nitrogen source, to provide 2-Furonitrile, a pharmaceutical intermediate and potential artificial sweetener.

Current research focuses on the use of iodanes in carbon-carbon and carbon-heteroatom bond-forming reactions. In one study, an intramolecular C-N coupling of an alkoxyhydroxylamine to its anisole group is accomplished with a catalytic amount of aryliodide in trifluoroethanol.

== See also ==
- Iminoiodinane
- Carbonyl oxidation with hypervalent iodine reagents
- Phenol oxidation with hypervalent iodine reagents
