= Iminoiodinane =

Class of hypervalent organoiodine compounds

An iminoiodinane (also known as iminoiodane or iodonium imide) is a hypervalent organoiodine compound with the general formula R-IN-R', where R and R' are organic side chains. Usually, R is an aryl group and R' is an electron-withdrawing group such as a sulfonyl group. The most commonly used iminoiodinane is [N-(p-Toluenesulfonyl)imino]phenyliodinane (PhINTs). (Note: As of November 19, 2025, PhINTs has by far the largest number of references out of all iminoiodinanes on CAS Scifinder.)

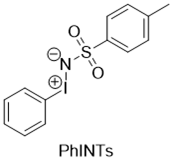
The structure of [N-(p-Toluenesulfonyl)imino]phenyliodinane.

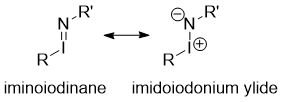
The resonance between iminoiodinane and imidoiodonium ylide structures.

Iminoiodinanes are electrophilies and are often used as a source of nitrene in organic synthesis. An iminoiodinane may be represented by its alternate resonance structure, an imidoiodonium ylide.

== History ==
The first report of iminoiodinanes in the literature was in 1974 by Abramovich et al., where the authors synthesized and characterized (methanesulfonylimino)phenyliodinane in an unsuccessful attempt to generate the corresponding sulfonylazepine. The following year, Yamada et al. characterized [N-(p-Toluenesulfonyl)imino]phenyliodinane (PhINTs), discovering its reactivity as a nitrogen electrophile.

In subsequent years, iminoiodinanes have been utilized extensively for organic synthesis as precursors of nitrene and nitrenoids, especially in aziridination, amination and imidation reactions.

== Properties ==
=== Structure and Bonding ===
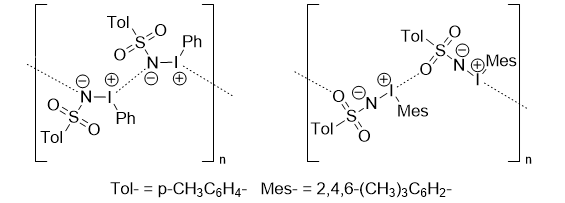
The crystal structures of two (N-arenesulfonyl)iminoiodinanes

X-ray crystallography studies show that common iminoiodinanes exist in linear polymeric form. In the case of PhINTs, the nitrogen atom in each molecule interacts with the iodine atom in the adjacent molecule, with each iodine adopting a distorted T-shaped geometry similar to the case of iodosobenzene. When the phenyl group is replaced by a more sterically hindered substituent, bridging is observed through oxygen atoms in the sulfonyl group instead of the nitrogen atom.

The N-I bond length in typical iminoiodinanes ranges from 1.98-2.05Å, and the R-I-N bond angle is slightly larger than 90 degrees°.

Iminoiodinanes are commonly represented with a formal double bond between the iodine and nitrogen, giving the iodine atom an electron count of 10. However, a computational bonding analysis has indicated that the N-I bond is more accurately described as a single dative bond, with the iodine center having 8 electrons.

=== Stability ===
The parent compound PhINH is thought to be unstable and has not been isolated, though it has been observed as a transient intermediate that forms upon mixing phenyliodine diacetate (PIDA) and ammonium carbamate.

2 PhI(OAc)_{2} + 3 NH_{4}OCONH_{2} → 2 PhINH + 4 NH_{4}OAc + 3 CO_{2}

Iminoiodinanes with strongly electron-withdrawing N-substituents tend to be much more stable, possibly due to their stabilization of the formal negative charge on the nitrogen atom. N-arenesulfonyl derivatives such as PhINTs are shelf- and air-stable and commercially available, making them by far the most popular class of iminoiodinanes. Derivatives with other electron-withdrawing groups, such as aliphatic sulfonyl groups or trifluoroacetyl groups, have also been synthesized. These tend to exhibit higher reactivity and lower stability.

On heating, most iminoiodinanes decompose, or in some cases, detonate.

=== Solubility ===
Iminoiodinanes are sparingly soluble in water and common nonpolar organic solvents due to their polymeric structure, while in some polar solvents such as THF, DMSO and methanol, they dissolve through decomposition. In the case of methanol, PhINTs is known to solubilize through solvolysis.

PhINTs + 2 MeOH → PhI(OMe)_{2} + TsNH_{2}

By incorporating substituents in the R group that coordinate to the iodine center, such as an ether substituent, solubility can be improved significantly. In these compounds, the molecules adopt a monomeric or dimeric structure instead of the typical polymeric structure. Solubility can also be improved by adding amine oxides, although this attenuates the reactivity as an electrophile.

== Preparation ==
Iminoiodinanes are most commonly prepared by reaction of the corresponding amide or sulfonamide and an appropriate organoiodine(III) compound under basic conditions. A typical synthesis combines PIDA and the corresponding amide with potassium hydroxide in methanol.

PhI(OAc)_{2} + RNH_{2} + 2 KOH → PhINR + 2 KOAc + H_{2}O

(R=acyl, organosulfonyl)

== Reactivity ==
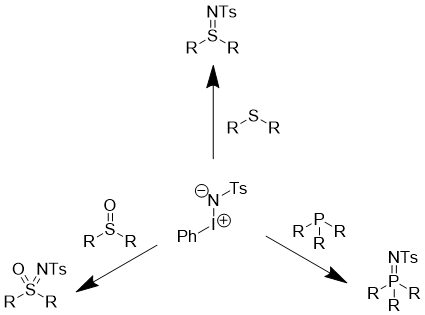
The reactions of PhINTs ([N-(p-Toluenesulfonyl)imino]phenyliodinane).

PhINTs and derivatives can react electrophilically at the nitrogen atom. Iminoiodinanes can transfer a nitrene (imino group) to nucleophiles, for example the heteroatoms found in sulfides, sulfoxides and phosphines.

Iminoiodinanes can also act as the oxidant in the Hofmann rearrangement.

=== Transition metal catalysis ===
Iminoiodinanes are known to react with transition metals to form metal nitrenoid intermediates, acting as a viable substitute for the corresponding azides, which are much more hazardous. In combination with iron, manganese, copper or silver catalysts, iminoiodinanes can be used to synthesize aziridines from alkenes. In particular, copper and silver catalysts used with chiral ligands can exhibit high stereoselectivity.

Manganese porphyrin complexes are known to catalyze insertion of the nitrene into allylic C-H bonds.

=== In situ generation of unstable derivatives ===
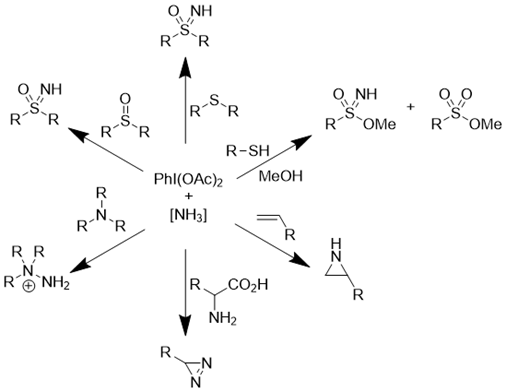
The reactions of PhINH, formed by mixing PIDA and an ammonia source.

The iminoiodinane PhINH can be generated in situ from an organoiodine(III) compound such as PIDA and a source of ammonia such as ammonium carbamate. This mixture is capable of nitrene transfer to heteroatoms including sulfur and nitrogen. In the case of sulfur, further oxidized products such as sulfoximines tend to form.

The mixture also reacts with amino acids and alkenes to form diazirines and aziridines, respectively, enabling metal-free synthesis of these strained nitrogen heterocycles.

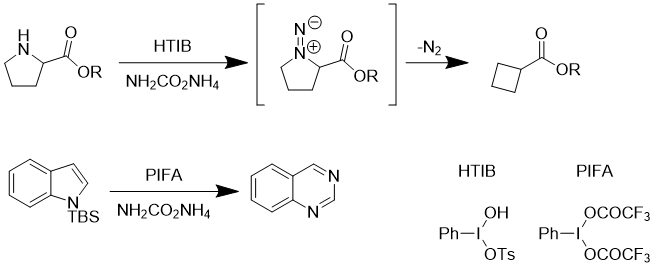
Two reaction schemes showcasing the use of iminoiodinanes in skeletal editing.

Similar mixtures are capable of skeletal editing. Methods for both nitrogen atom insertion and deletion have been reported.

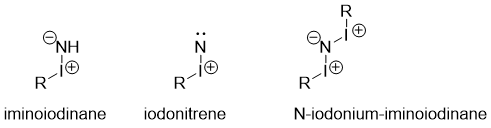
The three proposed intermediates in "iodonitrene-mediated" reactions.

Initially, PhINH as well as its oxidized form, iodonitrene, were observed by mass spectrometry, implicating them as the possible reactive species. Further studies suggest the possibility of a N-iodonium-iminoiodinane being the true reactive species.

=== Photo-induced nitrene release ===
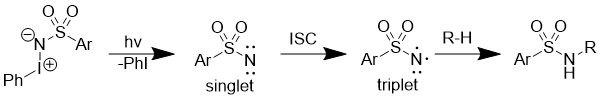
Photochemical nitrene generation from iminoiodinanes and the C-H insertion reactions they perform.

Upon photoexcitation, iminoiodinanes such as PhINTs can fragment into the corresponding nitrene and aryl iodide. Initially, a singlet nitrene is generated. The singlet state can react with Lewis basic nucleophiles such as sulfides to perform a nitrene transfer. This reaction proceeds much more rapidly compared to when the same reaction is performed without irradiation. In the absence of a strong Lewis base, the singlet nitrene eventually relaxes to the more stable triplet nitrene. The triplet state behaves as a diradical and can participate in synthetically useful transformations such as C-H functionalization and cyclization.

== See also ==
- Hypervalent organoiodine compounds
- Nitrene
