= Aromatic sulfonation =

Chemical reaction which replaces a hydrogen on an arene with sulfonic acid, –SO3H

In organic chemistry, aromatic sulfonation is a reaction in which a hydrogen atom on an arene is replaced by a sulfonic acid (−SO_{2}OH) group. Together with nitration and chlorination, aromatic sulfonation is a widely used electrophilic aromatic substitutions. Aryl sulfonic acids are used as detergents, dye, and drugs.

== Stoichiometry and mechanism ==
Sulfur trioxide is the active ingredient in many sulfonation reactions.

Typical conditions involve heating the aromatic compound with sulfuric acid:

C_{6}H_{6} + H_{2}SO_{4} → C_{6}H_{5}SO_{3}H + H_{2}O

Sulfur trioxide or its protonated derivative is the actual electrophile in this electrophilic aromatic substitution.

To drive the equilibrium, dehydrating agents such as thionyl chloride can be added:

C_{6}H_{6} + H_{2}SO_{4} + SOCl_{2} → C_{6}H_{5}SO_{3}H + SO_{2} + 2 HCl

Historically, mercurous sulfate has been used to catalyze the reaction.

Chlorosulfuric acid is also an effective agent:

C_{6}H_{6} + HSO_{3}Cl → C_{6}H_{5}SO_{3}H + HCl

In contrast to aromatic nitration and most other electrophilic aromatic substitutions this reaction is reversible. Sulfonation takes place in concentrated acidic conditions and desulfonation is the mode of action in a dilute hot aqueous acid. The reaction is very useful in protecting the aromatic system because of this reversibility. Due to their electron withdrawing effects, sulfonate protecting groups can be used to prevent electrophilic aromatic substitution. They can also be installed as directing groups to affect the position where a substitution may take place.

== Specialized sulfonation methods ==
Many method have been developed for introducing sulfonate groups aside from direction sulfonation.

A classic named reaction is the Piria reaction (Raffaele Piria, 1851) in which nitrobenzene is treated with a metal bisulfite forming an aminosulfonic acid as a result of combined nitro group reduction and sulfonation.

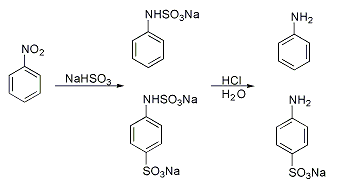
The Piria reaction

In the Tyrer sulfonation process (1917), at some time of technological importance, benzene vapor is led through a vessel containing 90% sulfuric acid the temperature of which is increased from 100 to 180°C. Water and benzene are continuously removed and the benzene fed back to the vessel. In this way an 80% yield is obtained.

Synthesis of sulfanilic acid from aniline and sulfuric acid.

== Applications ==
Allura Red AC, a food coloring agent, is made by a multistep process that includes two sulfonations.

Aromatic sulfonic acids are intermediates in the preparation of dyes and many pharmaceuticals. Sulfonation of anilines lead to a large group of sulfa drugs.

Sulfonation of polystyrene is used to make sodium polystyrene sulfonate, a common ion exchange resin for water softening.

== See also ==
- Electrophilic halogenation
- Nitration
- Perchlorylbenzene
