= Heteroatom-promoted lateral lithiation =

Heteroatom-promoted lateral lithiation is the site-selective replacement of a benzylic hydrogen atom for lithium for the purpose of further functionalization. Heteroatom-containing substituents may direct metalation to the benzylic site closest to the heteroatom or increase the acidity of the ring carbons via an inductive effect.

== Introduction ==
Toluene derivatives with heteroatom-containing substituents in the ortho position undergo site-selective benzylic lithiation in the presence of organolithium compounds (either alkyllithiums or lithium dialkylamides). Coordination of the Lewis acidic lithium atom to the Lewis basic heteroatom, as well as inductive effects derived from the electronegativity of the heteroatom, encourage selective deprotonation at the benzylic position. Competitive ring metalation (directed ortho-metalation) is an important side reaction, but a judicious choice of base often allows for selective benzylic metalation. Useful heteroatom-containing directing groups include dialkylamines, amides (secondary or tertiary), ketone enolates, carbamates, and sulfonates. Lateral lithiation of alkyl-substituted heterocycles incorporating heteroatom-containing substituents is also possible, although ring lithiation α to the ring heteroatom may compete with lateral lithiation. The products of lateral lithiation react with a variety of electrophiles, including reactive alkyl halides (allylic, benzylic, and primary), carbonyl compounds, silyl and stannyl chlorides, disulfides and diselenides, and others. A general, highly selective method for benzylic metalation using a mixed lithium and potassium metal amide (LiNK chemistry) has been developed which permits metalation regardless of the relative position (ortho, meta or para) of the methyl group to the heteroatom containing substituent

(1)

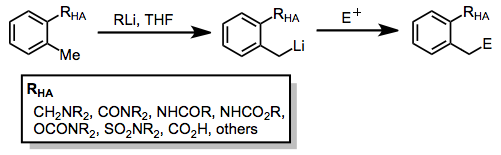

== Mechanism and stereochemistry ==
=== Prevailing mechanism ===
Two limiting mechanisms, one operating under kinetic and the other thermodynamic control, have been identified for lateral lithiation reactions. The mechanisms of most lateral lithiations fall somewhere between these two limiting mechanisms, and the precise mechanism of a particular lithiation depends on two factors:

- The Lewis acidity of the organolithium reagent (RLi > LiNR_{2})
- The Lewis basicity of the heteroatom substituent (N > O > S)

When both the Lewis acidity of the organolithium compound and the Lewis basicity of the substituent are high, as in lithiations of ortho-(dialkylamino)methyl toluenes with n-butyllithium in a non-coordinating solvent, coordination of the base to the heteroatom substituent takes place. Lithiation then occurs at the most kinetically accessible ortho benzylic position; ortho lithiation is slower in this case.

(2)

As either the Lewis acidity of the base or the coordinating ability of the substituent decrease, a mechanism involving purely inductive effects becomes more important. For instance, the lithiation of 1 with lithium di(isopropyl)amide (LDA) affords only the product of benzylic metalation 2; none of the ortho-lithiated product 3 is observed. This result is explained by a mechanism in which the amide substituent affects the acidity of the para benzylic position solely through inductive effects and coordination of the base is not operative. Deprotonation occurs to afford the most thermodynamically stable product.

(3)

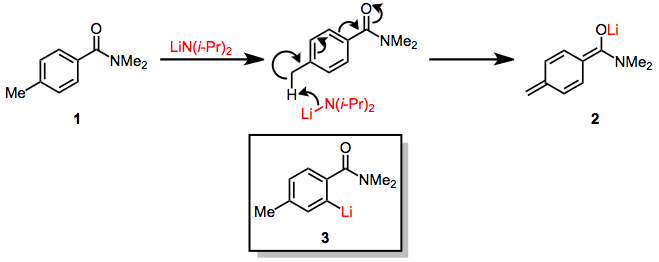

In most cases, both mechanisms will lead to the same product, as the sites of kinetic and thermodynamic deprotonation will coincide.

== Scope and limitations ==
A variety of heteroatom-containing substituents promote lateral lithiation of an ortho methyl group. Generally, better results are obtained when the heteroatom is in the β position rather than the α position, as the latter tends to promote ortho lithiation. Lithation of primary benzylic positions is slower than lithiation of methyl groups due to inductive electron donation from the additional alkyl group (rather than steric effects). Electrophiles that react with the benzylic anions formed by these methods include aldehydes and ketones, activated (primary, allylic, or benzylic) halides, molecular oxygen, and silyl chlorides. This section describes the scope of directing groups that may be used to effect site-selective lithiation in substituted benzenes and heterocycles.

=== Lithiations of substituted benzenes ===
Aldehyde substituents suffer nucleophilic addition in the presence of organolithium compounds; however, adducts of aldehydes with lithium diamines can serve as effective directing groups for lateral lithiation. Subsequent treatment with an electrophilic primary alkyl halide and elimination of the diamine provides functionalized aryl aldehydes.

(4)

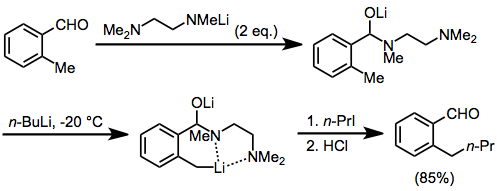

Tertiary amides are highly effective directing groups. After treatment of the resulting benzylic anion with an aldehyde, cyclization leads to lactones. Carboxamides, in which the amide is attached to the aromatic ring through nitrogen rather than carbon, are also effective directing groups.

(5)

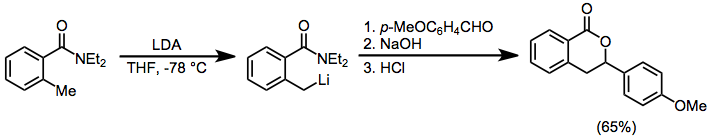

Related O-aryl carbamates are good directing groups; upon warming, the resulting organolithiums undergo rearrangement to benzylic amides (the Snieckus-Fries rearrangement) via migration of the carbonyl carbon from oxygen to carbon.

(6)

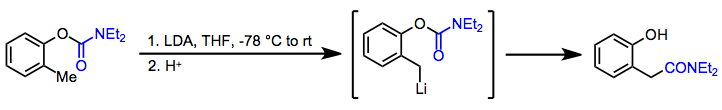

Secondary N-aryl carbamates (along with secondary amides, ketones, and other directing groups containing acidic hydrogens) must be treated with two equivalents of organolithium reagent for lateral lithiation to occur. In the case below, sec-butyllithium is used to avoid competitive addition to the Boc group.

(7)

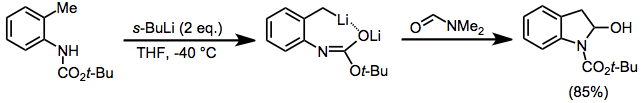

Sulfonamides require two equivalents of an organolithium reagent for lateral lithiation, but represent a useful class of directing groups. Treatment with ketones leads to tertiary alcohols in high yield.

(8)

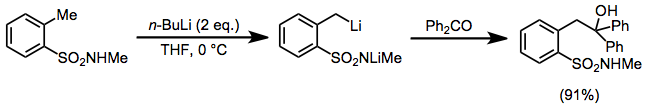

=== Lithiations of substituted heterocycles ===
Convenient generation of a directing group on the nitrogen of indoles is possible through treatment with an organolithium reagent and carbon dioxide. A similar method can be applied for lateral lithiations of ortho-tolyl anilines.

(9)

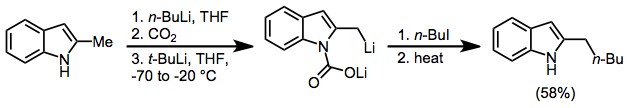

Oxazoles containing two methyl groups exhibit interesting selectivity patterns. In the absence of a directing substituent, the methyl group closer to the more electronegative oxygen atom is selectively metalated. However, in the presence of a directing substituent, the director fully controls the site of lithiation.

(10)

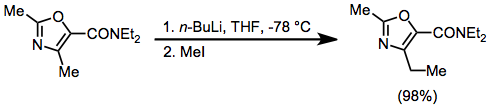

== Synthetic applications ==
Ortho lithiation followed by methylation with methyl iodide is a convenient method for the synthesis of starting materials for lateral lithiations. Elaboration of the benzylic carbon through lateral lithiation and treatment with an electrophile provides a powerful synthetic alternative to direct electrophilic aromatic substitution (EAS). Although yields over the entire sequence are moderate, site selectivity is generally higher than analogous EAS reactions.

(11)

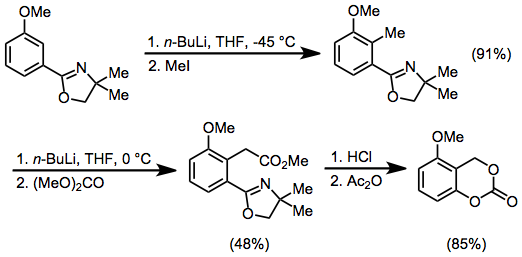

== Comparison to other methods ==
Ortho lithiation can be used to generate many of the same structures as lateral lithiation; however, reactivity differences between aryl- and benzyllithium species may suggest the use of one method over the other. A useful alternative method for stereoselective functionalization of the benzylic position involves the use of chromium arene complexes. Substitution at the benzylic position is much better tolerated in methods that employ benzylic lithiation of chromium arene complexes than lateral lithiations; however, the chromium byproducts of these reactions pose waste disposal difficulties. The use of mixed zinc/copper organometallic reagents generated from benzyl bromides represents a second alternative to lateral lithiation. The functional group compatibility of this method is greater than lateral lithiation, but more steps are required to generate the reactive organometallic species from an unfunctionalized benzylic position.

== Experimental conditions and procedure ==
=== Typical conditions ===
Organolithium reagents are sensitive to moisture and thus should be handled under inert atmosphere in anhydrous conditions. Tetrahydrofuran is the most common solvent employed for lateral lithiation reactions. Measurement of the concentration of commercial or prepared alkyllithium solutions may be accomplished using well-established titration methods.

A useful indicator for the progress of lateral lithiations is the color of the reaction mixture. Benzyllithium compounds range in color from red to deep purple, and in many cases the lack of a color change upon addition of an organolithium reagent to the substrate may indicate the presence of an undesired proton source in solution.

=== Example procedure ===
(12)

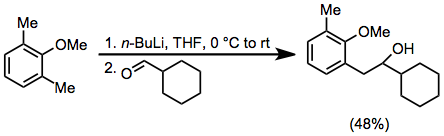

n-Butyllithium (14.0 mL of a 2.5 M solution in hexane, 35 mmol) was added dropwise to a solution of 2,6-dimethylanisole (4.95 mL, 35 mmol) in 60 mL of tetrahydrofuran at 0°, and the resulting solution was stirred at 0° for 1 hour and then at ambient temperature for 4 hours. The reaction mixture was cooled to 0°, treated with cyclohexanecarboxaldehyde (4.2 mL, 35 mmol), allowed to warm to ambient temperature again, and poured into saturated aqueous ammonium chloride solution. The mixture was extracted with ether and the ether extract was washed with water and brine and concentrated in vacuo. The residue was purified by silica gel chromatography (hexane-ether, 5:1 v/v) to give 4.2 g (48%) of the product as a colorless oil; ^{1}H NMR (CDCl_{3}) δ 1.05–1.50 (m, 6H), 1.64–1.82 (m, 4H), 1.92 (m, 1H), 2.28 (d, 1H, J = 3 Hz), 2.31 (s, 3H), 2.68 (dd, 1H, J = 10, 13 Hz), 2.85 (dd, 1H, J = 3, 13 Hz), 3.57 (m, 1H), 3.75 (s, 3H), 6.95–7.10 (m, 3H).
