= Iodobenzene dichloride =

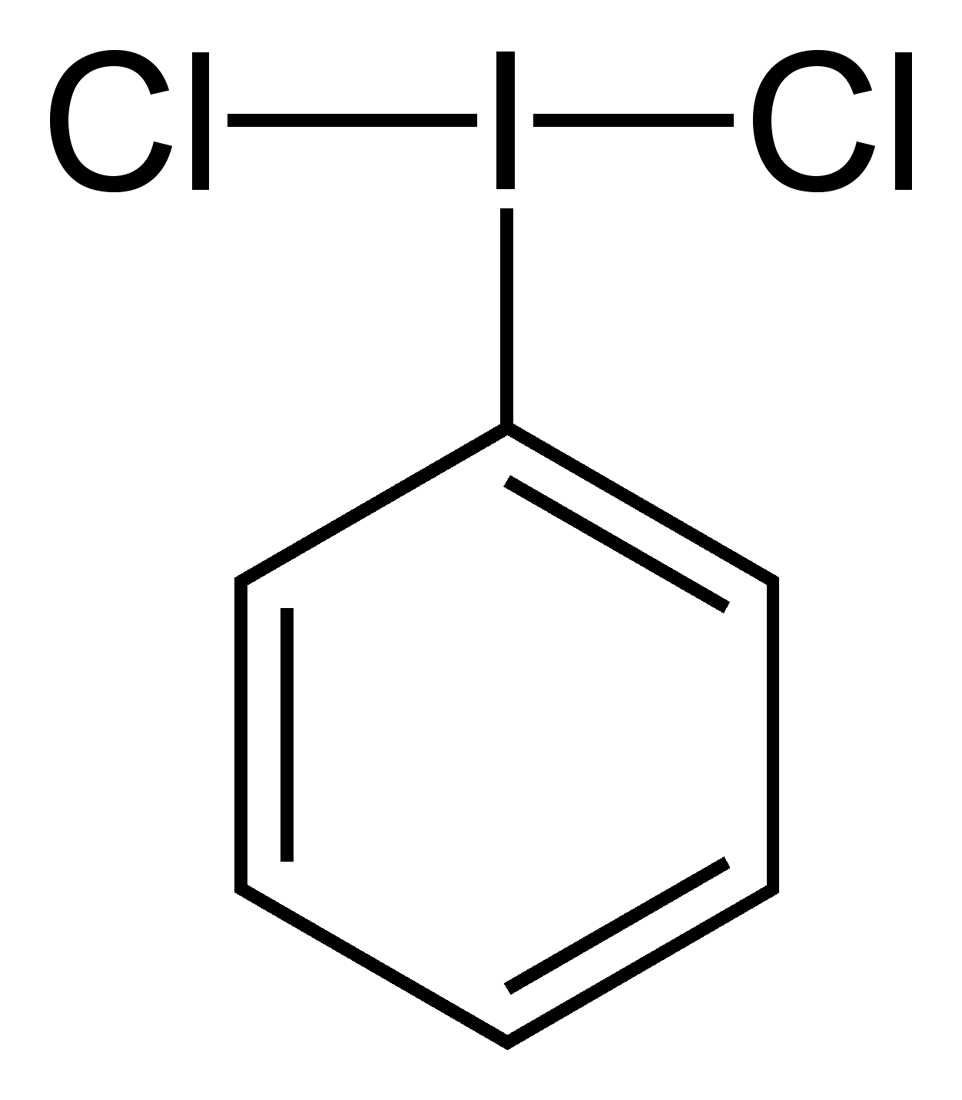

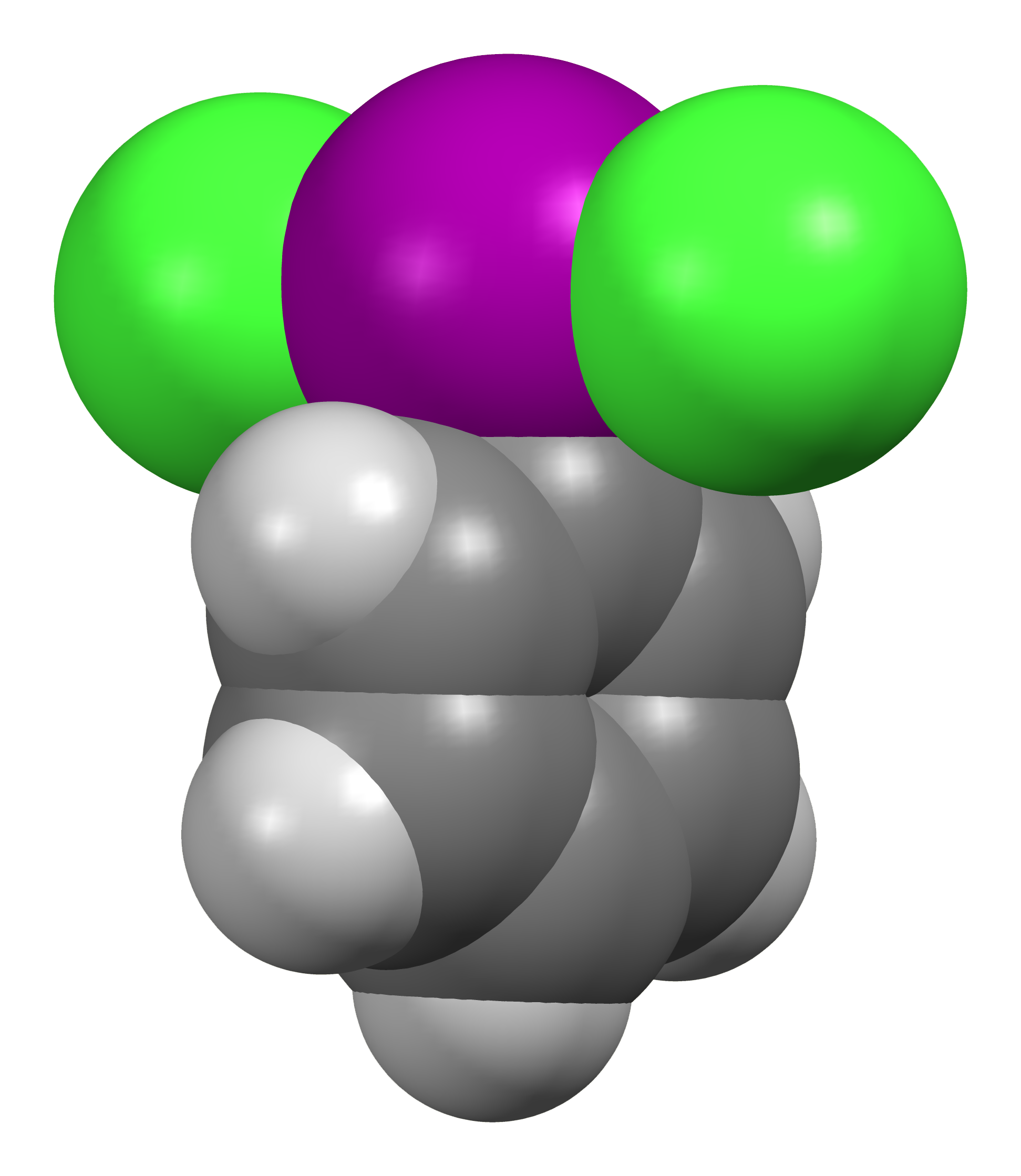

Names
- Preferred IUPAC name Dichloro(phenyl)-λ^{3}-iodane
- Other names Iodosobenzene dichloride; Phenyliodine(III) dichloride; Phenyliodo dichloride; Phenyliodoso chloride; Phenylchloroiodonium chloride; Dichloroiodobenzene; Iododichlorobenzene

Identifiers
CAS Number	932-72-9
3D model (JSmol)	Interactive image
Abbreviations	IBD
ChemSpider	254526
PubChem CID	13166207
UNII	0IJ835PQB7
CompTox Dashboard (EPA)	DTXSID50302248
- InChI: InChI=1S/C6H5I.2ClH/c7-6-4-2-1-3-5-6;;/h1-5H;2*1H/p-2 Key: UYULBUPHXKLNMO-UHFFFAOYSA-L
- SMILES: Cl[I](c1ccccc1)Cl

Properties
Chemical formula	C_{6}H_{5}Cl_{2}I
Molar mass	274.91 g·mol^{−1}
Appearance	Yellow solid
Density	2.2 g/cm^{3}
Melting point	115 to 120 °C (239 to 248 °F; 388 to 393 K) (decomposes)
- Except where otherwise noted, data are given for materials in their standard state (at 25 °C [77 °F], 100 kPa). verify (what is ?) Infobox references

Iodobenzene dichloride (PhICl_{2}) is a complex of iodobenzene with chlorine. As a reagent for organic chemistry, it is used as an oxidant and chlorinating agent.

== Chemical structure ==
Single-crystal X-ray crystallography has been used to determine its structure; as can be predicted by VSEPR theory, it adopts a T-shaped geometry about the central iodine atom.

== Preparation ==
Iodobenzene dichloride is not stable and is not commonly available commercially. It is prepared by passing chlorine gas through a solution of iodobenzene in chloroform, from which it precipitates. The same reaction has been reported at pilot plant scale (20 kg) as well.

Ph-I + Cl_{2} → PhICl_{2}

An alternate preparation involving the use of chlorine generated in situ by the action of sodium hypochlorite on hydrochloric acid has also been described.

== Reactions ==
Iodobenzene dichloride is hydrolyzed by basic solutions to give iodosobenzene (PhIO) and is oxidized by sodium hypochlorite to give iodoxybenzene (PhIO_{2}).

In organic synthesis, iodobenzene dichloride is used as a reagent for the selective chlorination of alkenes and alkynes.
