= Barton–Kellogg reaction =

Chemical reaction

Named after	Sir Derek Barton; Richard M. Kellogg
Reaction type	Coupling reaction

Identifiers
RSC ontology ID	RXNO:0000495

The Barton–Kellogg reaction is a coupling reaction between a diazo compound and a thioketone, giving an alkene by way of an episulfide intermediate. The Barton–Kellogg reaction is also known as Barton–Kellogg olefination and Barton olefin synthesis.

The Barton-Kellogg reaction

This reaction was pioneered by Hermann Staudinger, and also goes by the name Staudinger type diazo-thioketone coupling.

== Reaction mechanism ==
In the reaction mechanism for this reaction, the diazo compound reacts as a 1,3-dipole in a 1,3-dipolar cycloaddition with the thioketone to give a 5-membered thiadiazoline ring. This intermediate is unstable; it extrudes a molecule of nitrogen to form a thiocarbonyl ylide, which then cyclizes to form a stable episulfide. Triphenylphosphine reacts as a nucleophile, opening the three-membered ring to form a sulfaphosphatane. In a manner similar to the Wittig reaction, this structure then expels triphenylphosphine sulfide to produce an alkene.

Barton-Kellogg reaction mechanism

== Scope ==
The diazo compound can be obtained from a ketone by reaction with hydrazine to a hydrazone followed by oxidation. Many reagents exist for this conversion for example silver(I) oxide and (bis(trifluoroacetoxy)iodo)benzene. The thioketone required for this reaction can be obtained from a ketone and phosphorus pentasulfide. Desulfurization of the episulfide can be accomplished by many phosphines and also by copper powder.

Barton-Kellogg reaction molecular motor synthesis

The main advantage of this reaction over the McMurry reaction is the notion that the reaction can take place with two different ketones. In this regard the diazo-thioketone coupling is a cross-coupling rather than a homocoupling.
