= Phenol oxidation with hypervalent iodine reagents =

Phenol oxidation with hypervalent iodine reagents leads to the formation of quinone-type products or iodonium ylides, depending on the structure of the phenol. Trapping of either product is possible with a suitable reagent, and this method is often employed with a second process.

== Introduction ==
In the presence of hypervalent iodine(III) reagents such as iodobenzene diacetate (IBD) or iodobenzene di(trifluoroacetate) (IBTA), phenols undergo oxidation to either quinones. or iodonium ylides. Phenols with an electron- withdrawing group in the para position form the latter, while most other phenols give the former (or derivatives thereof). Direct transformation of quinone products may occur through intramolecular Diels-Alder or Michael-type reactions. Bis(phenol) substrates undergo oxidative coupling under these conditions.

Iodonium ylides are relatively stable, versatile compounds that undergo substitution and cycloaddition reactions. They are represented using two resonance forms, one zwitterionic (the "betaine" form) and the other neutral (the "ylide" form).

(1)

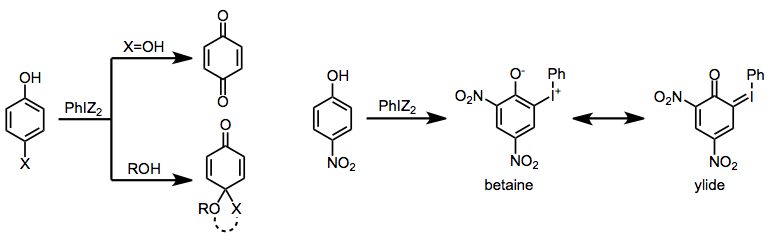

== Mechanism and Stereochemistry ==
=== Prevailing Mechanism ===
The mechanism of phenol oxidation with hypervalent iodine reagents begins with the formation of an aryloxyiodonium(III) intermediate. Inter- or intramolecular nucleophilic attack then takes place, either in one step or in two via an oxenium ion. If the substrate contains a diene, the quinone thus produced may undergo intramolecular [4+2] cycloaddition. Alternatively, the presence of a second nucleophilic group may lead to Michael-type adducts (see the lower pathway of equation (2) below).

(2)

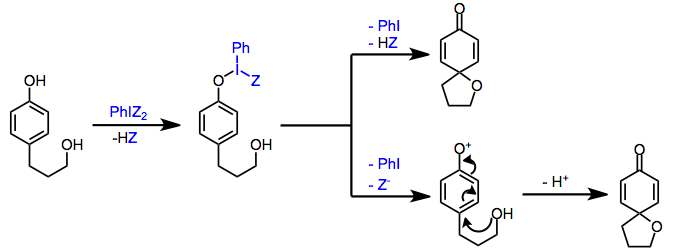

When the phenol contains an electron-withdrawing group in the para position and at least one ortho hydrogen, stable iodonium ylides result. The initial intermediates are iodonium salts, which eliminate HZ to form the ylide. Iodonium ylides undergo cycloaddition reactions with unsaturated functional groups, and react with nucleophiles and electrophiles to give substitution products.

(3)

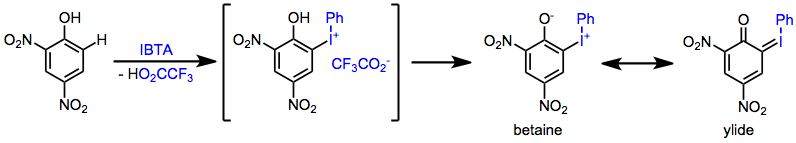

Oxidative coupling of bis(phenols) takes place in the presence of iodine(III) reagents. The mechanism of this process is analogous to the formation of para-substituted quinones via intramolecular nucleophilic attack. Mixtures of products may result from attack at inequivalent ortho or para positions.

(4)

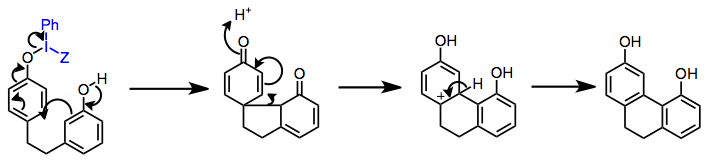

== Scope and Limitations ==
Phenolic oxidations may afford different products depending on both the reaction conditions and the structure of the substrate. 2-Substituted phenols form ortho quinones upon oxidation. These products are unstable and undergo dimerization.

(5)

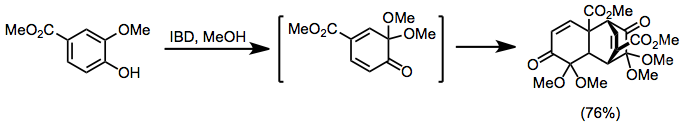

When external nucleophiles are added to phenolic oxidations, further reactions of the nucleophile with the resulting quinone may occur. Intramolecular Diels-Alder reactions have been observed in this context.

(6)

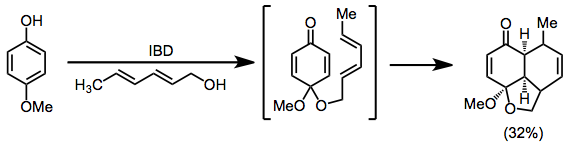

In substrates appropriately substituted with a nucleophile, Michael addition may occur. Michael addition has been invoked in oxidations of phenolic amides (equation (7)).

(7)

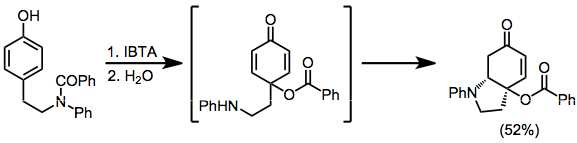

Substrates containing two phenols (or an aniline and a phenol; see equation (8) below for a related example), undergo oxidative coupling in the presence of hypervalent iodine(III) reagents. Coupling of both the ortho and para positions is possible; however, the use of bulky silyl-protected phenols provides complete selectivity for para coupling. In the example below, coordination of iodine to nitrogen is believed to precede C-C bond formation.

(8)

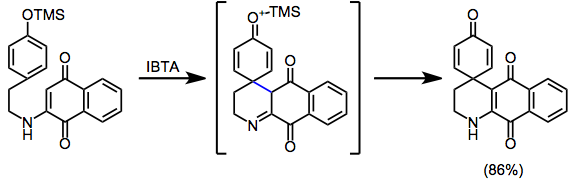

Iodonium ylides undergo cycloaddition with alkene acceptors in low yields. In the presence of nucleophiles, substitution of the iodonium group occurs.

(9)

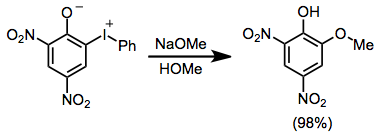

Reactions with electrophiles yield iodonium salts, which may be quenched in situ by nucleophilic counteranions. In the presence of non-nucleophilic counteranions, the substituted iodonium salts can be isolated.

(10)

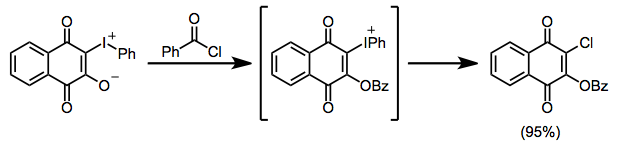

== Synthetic Applications ==
Oxidative phenol coupling has been used for the synthesis of alkaloids related to morphine. For instance, the reaction has been employed to transform reticuline derivatives into salutaridine derivatives in a single, presumably biomimetic, step. Yields of reactions of this type tend to be low, however.

(11)

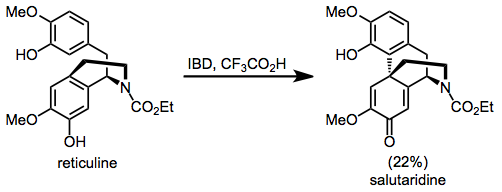

== Comparison with Other Methods ==
Most alternatives to oxidation with hypervalent iodine reagents require the use of environmentally unfriendly metals. However, they may provide comparable or better yields than hypervalent iodine methods.

(12)

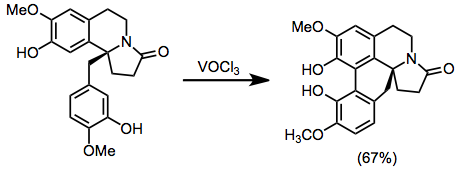

Exposure of phenols to Fremy's salt or cerium(IV) ammonium nitrate also yields quinones.

(13)

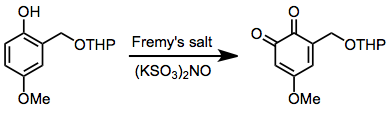

The organic oxidant 2,3-dichloro-5,6-dicyano-1,4-benzoquinone (DDQ) can accomplish many of the same transformations that iodine(III) reagents can, sometimes with higher selectivity.

== Experimental Conditions and Procedure ==
=== Typical Conditions ===
Organohypervalent iodine reagents are typically solids that are fairly stable at room temperature and generally insensitive to atmospheric oxygen and moisture. Most reagents have relatively low toxicity and can be handled easily. IBD and IBTA are stable and commercially available, or can be prepared by standard procedures. Iodosobenzene can be prepared by hydrolysis of either (dichloroiodo)benzene or IBD and should be stored in a refrigerator in dark containers.

=== Example Procedure ===
(14)

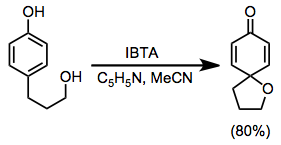

To a stirred solution of p-(3-hydroxypropyl)phenol (152 mg, 1 mmol) and pyridine (0.3 mL) in acetonitrile (10 mL) at 0° was added a solution of IBTA (430 mg, 1 mmol) in acetonitrile (2 mL). The mixture was stirred at room temperature for 10 minutes, diluted with water, and extracted with diethyl ether (3 × 10 mL). The combined organic extracts were washed with saturated aqueous sodium chloride solution, dried (MgSO_{4}), and concentrated in vacuo. The residue was purified by column chromatography on silica gel using hexanes-ethyl acetate to give 89 mg (59%) of the title product as a syrup; IR (CHCl_{3}) 1630, 1670, 1690 cm^{−1}; ^{1}H NMR (CDCl_{3}) δ 2.0–2.4 (m, 4 H), 4.06 (t, J = 6 Hz, 2 H), 6.08 (d, J = 10 Hz, 2 H), 6.76 (d, J = 10 Hz, 2 H).
