= Periodinane =

The Dess-Martin periodinane

Periodinanes also known as λ^{5}-iodanes are organoiodine compounds with iodine in the +5 oxidation state. These compounds are described as hypervalent because the iodine center has more than 8 valence electrons.

== Periodinane compounds ==
The λ^{5}-iodanes such as the Dess-Martin periodinane have square pyramidal geometry with 4 heteroatoms in basal positions and one apical phenyl group.

Iodoxybenzene or iodylbenzene, C_{6}H_{5}IO_{2}, is a known oxidizing agent.

Dess-Martin periodinane (1983) is another powerful oxidant and an improvement of the IBX acid already in existence in 1983. The IBX acid is prepared from 2-iodobenzoic acid and potassium bromate and sulfuric acid and is insoluble in most solvents whereas the Dess-Martin reagent prepared from reaction of the IBX acid with acetic anhydride is very soluble. The oxidation mechanism ordinarily consists of a ligand exchange reaction followed by a reductive elimination.

== Uses ==
The predominant use of periodinanes is as oxidizing reagents replacing toxic reagents based on heavy metals.

== See also ==
- Carbonyl oxidation with hypervalent iodine reagents
- Dess–Martin oxidation
