= (Bis(trifluoroacetoxy)iodo)benzene =

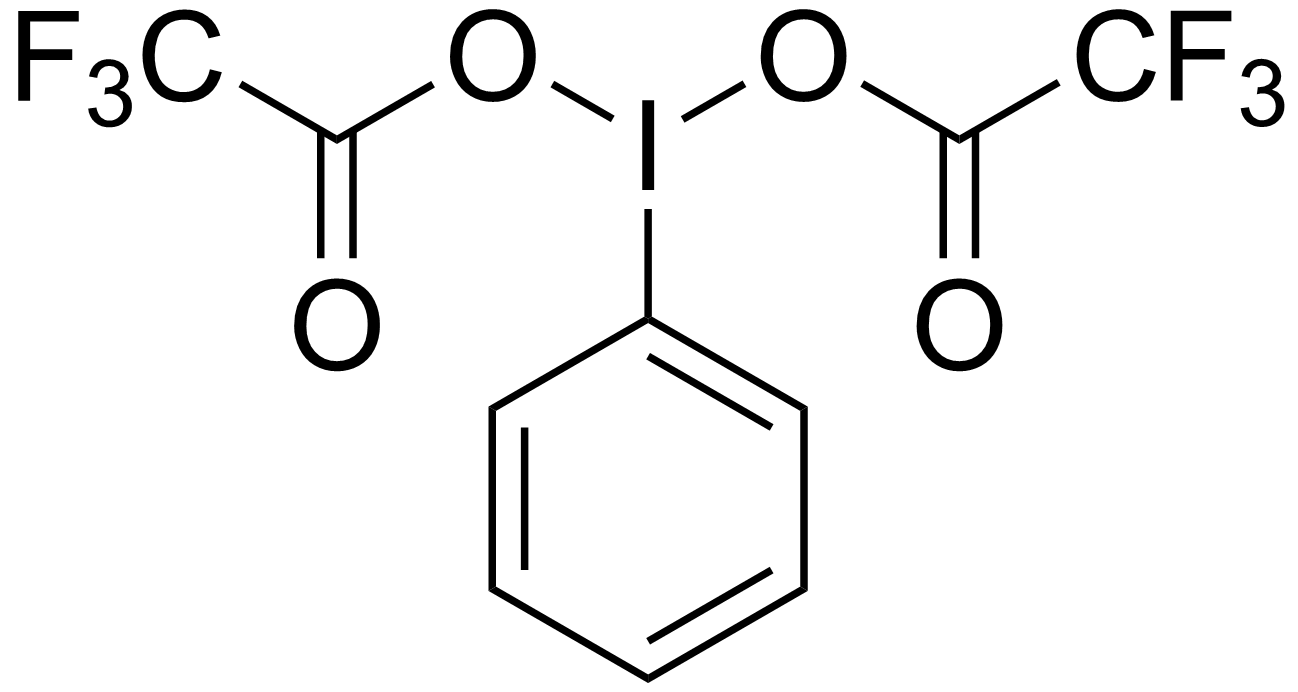

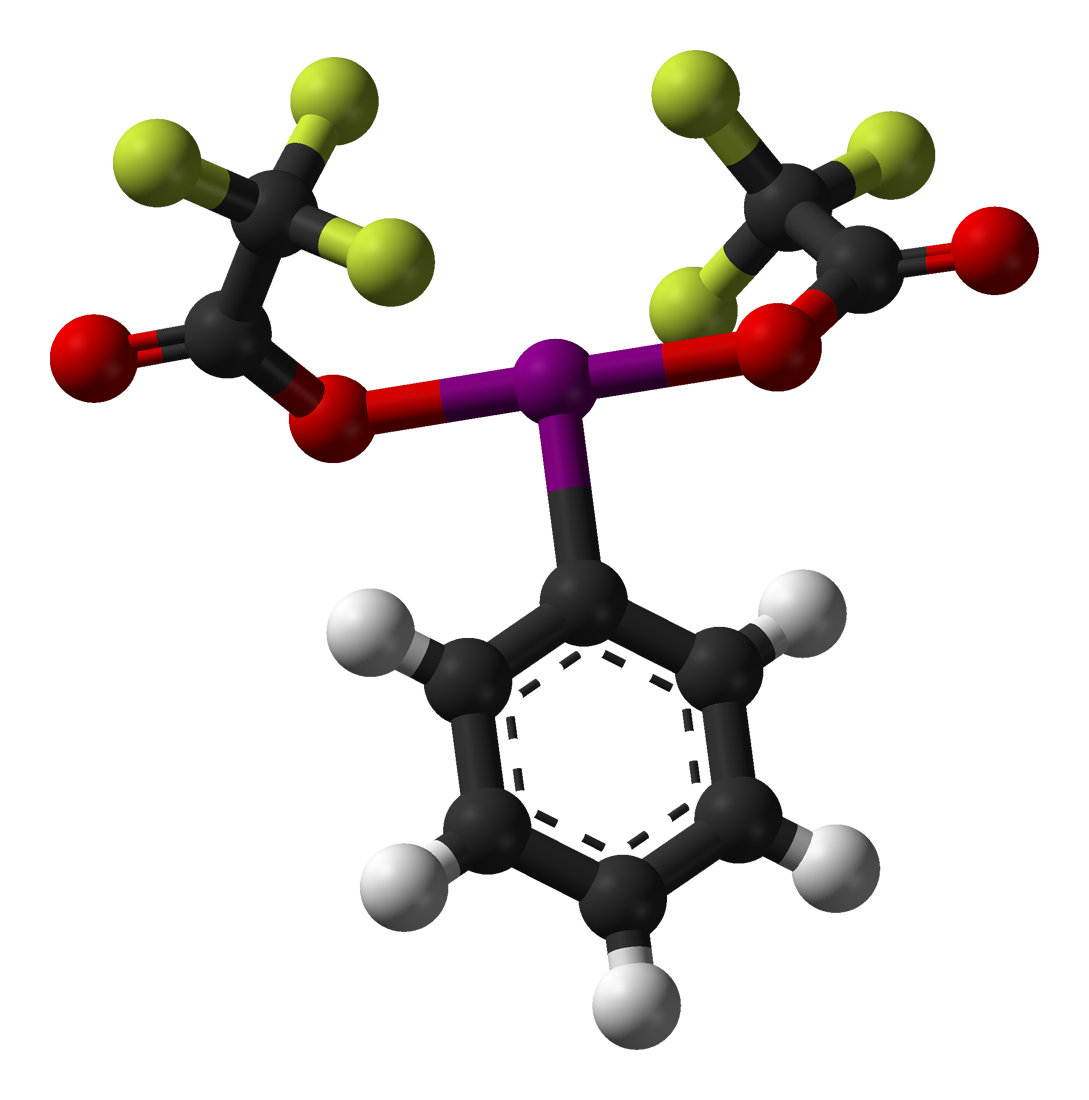

Names
- Preferred IUPAC name 1,1′-[(Phenyl-λ^{3}-iodanediyl)bis(oxy)]bis(2,2,2-trifluoroethan-1-one)
- Other names Phenyliodine bis(trifluoroacetate); PIFA

Identifiers
CAS Number	2712-78-9
3D model (JSmol)	Interactive image
ChemSpider	92428
ECHA InfoCard	100.018.462
EC Number	220-308-0
PubChem CID	102317
UNII	659SFV27XS
CompTox Dashboard (EPA)	DTXSID40181584
- InChI: InChI=1S/C10H5F6IO4/c11-9(12,13)7(18)20-17(6-4-2-1-3-5-6)21-8(19)10(14,15)16/h1-5H Key: PEZNEXFPRSOYPL-UHFFFAOYSA-N; InChI=1/C10H5F6IO4/c11-9(12,13)7(18)20-17(6-4-2-1-3-5-6)21-8(19)10(14,15)16/h1-5H Key: PEZNEXFPRSOYPL-UHFFFAOYAA
- SMILES: FC(F)(F)C(=O)OI(OC(=O)C(F)(F)F)c1ccccc1

Properties
Chemical formula	C_{10}H_{5}F_{6}IO_{4}
Molar mass	430.041 g·mol^{−1}

Hazards
- GHS labelling
Pictograms	(GHS07: Exclamation mark)
Signal word	Warning
Hazard statements	H315, H319, H335
Precautionary statements	P261, P264, P271, P280, P302+P352, P304+P340, P305+P351+P338, P312, P321, P332+P313, P337+P313, P362, P403+P233, P405, P501
- Except where otherwise noted, data are given for materials in their standard state (at 25 °C [77 °F], 100 kPa). verify (what is ?) Infobox references

(Bis(trifluoroacetoxy)iodo)benzene, C_{6}H_{5}I(OCOCF_{3})_{2}, is a hypervalent iodine compound used as a reagent in organic chemistry. It can be used to carry out the Hofmann rearrangement under acidic conditions.

== Preparation ==
The syntheses of all aryl hypervalent iodine compounds start from iodobenzene. The compound can be prepared by reaction of iodobenzene with a mixture of trifluoroperacetic acid and trifluoroacetic acid in a method analogous to the synthesis of (diacetoxyiodo)benzene:

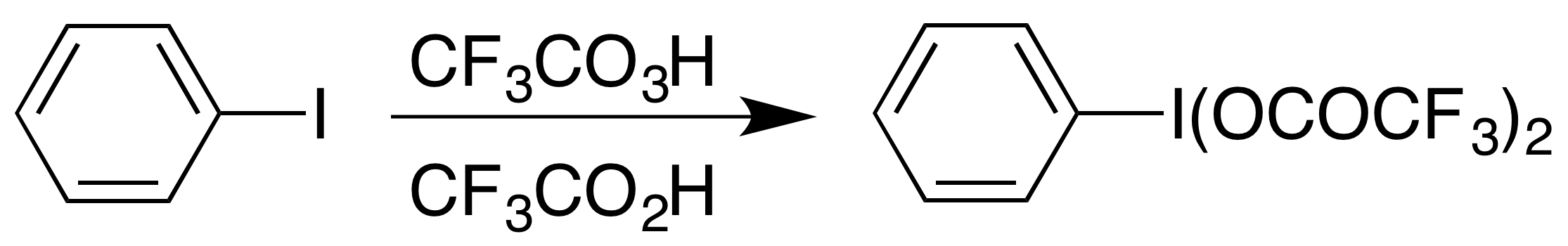

It can also be prepared by dissolving diacetoxyiodobenzene (a commercially available compound) with heating in trifluoroacetic acid:

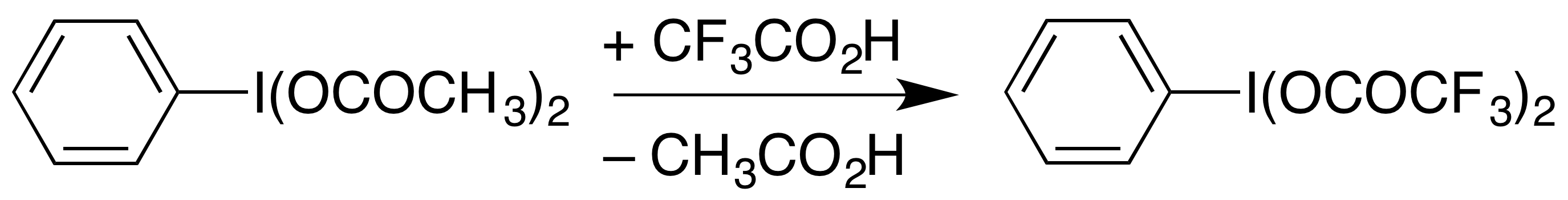

== Uses ==
It also brings around the conversion of a hydrazone to a diazo compound, for example in the diazo-thioketone coupling. It also converts thioacetals to their parent carbonyl compounds.

=== Hofmann rearrangement ===
The Hofmann rearrangement is a decarbonylation reaction whereby an amide is converted to an amine by way of an isocyanate intermediate. It is usually carried out under strongly basic conditions.

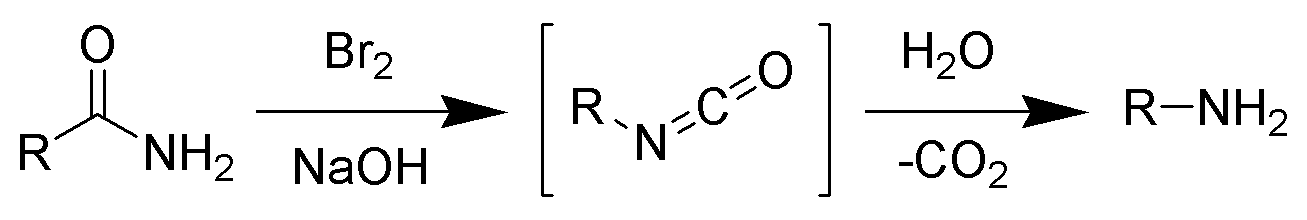

The reaction can also be carried out under mildly acidic conditions by way of the same intermediate using a hypervalent iodine compound in aqueous solution. An example published in Organic Syntheses is the conversion of cyclobutanecarboxamide, easily synthesized from cyclobutylcarboxylic acid, to cyclobutylamine. The primary amine is initially present as its trifluoroacetate salt, which can be converted to the hydrochloride salt to facilitate product purification.

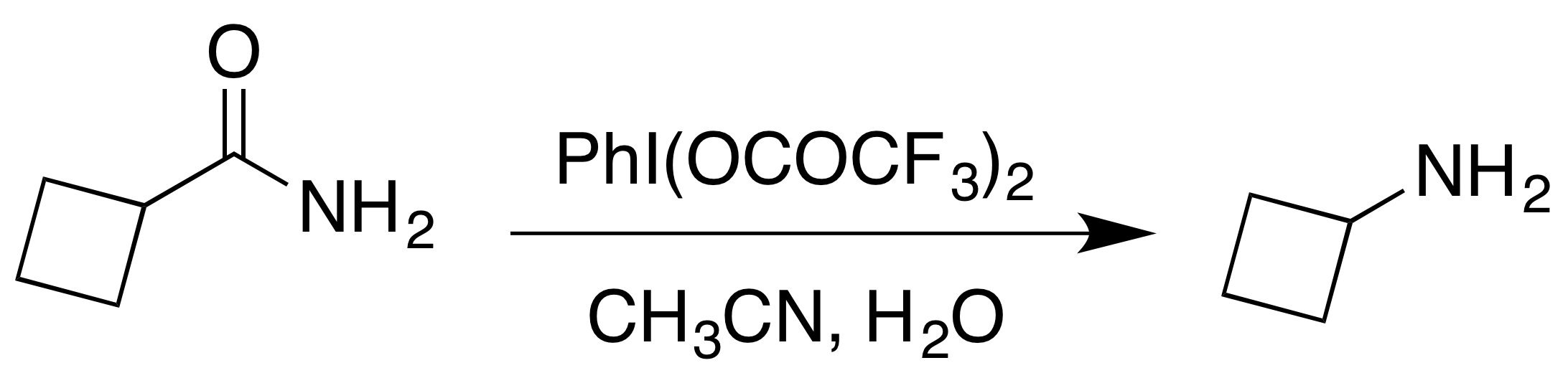
