= Perchlorylbenzene =

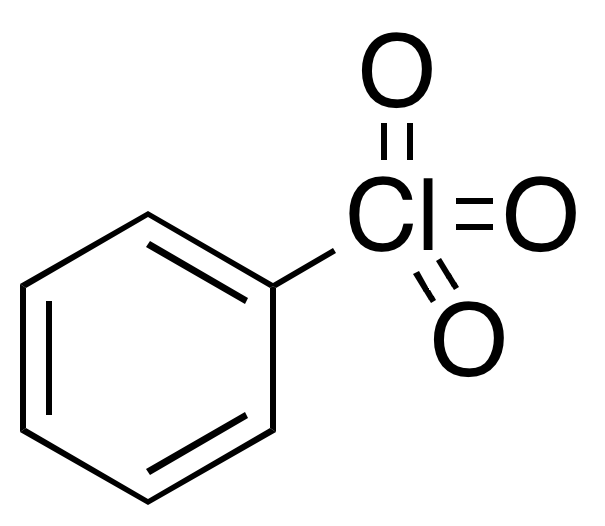

Names
- IUPAC name (Trioxo-λ^{7}-chloranyl)benzene
- Other names Phenyltrioxo-λ^{7}-chlorane

Identifiers
CAS Number	5390-07-8
3D model (JSmol)	Interactive image
PubChem CID	21559072
- InChI: InChI=1S/C6H5ClO3/c8-7(9,10)6-4-2-1-3-5-6/h1-5H Key: XUEMDHFELUYLBX-UHFFFAOYSA-N
- SMILES: C1=CC=C(C=C1)Cl(=O)(=O)=O

Properties
Chemical formula	C_{6}H_{5}ClO_{3}
Molar mass	160.55 g·mol^{−1}
Boiling point	232 °C (450 °F; 505 K) (78 °C @ 2 mmHg)

Hazards
- Occupational safety and health (OHS/OSH)
Main hazards	Explosive
- Except where otherwise noted, data are given for materials in their standard state (at 25 °C [77 °F], 100 kPa). Infobox references

Perchlorylbenzene (C_{6}H_{5}ClO_{3}, PhClO_{3}), is an aromatic compound prepared by direct electrophilic perchlorylation of benzene using perchloryl fluoride and aluminum trichloride:

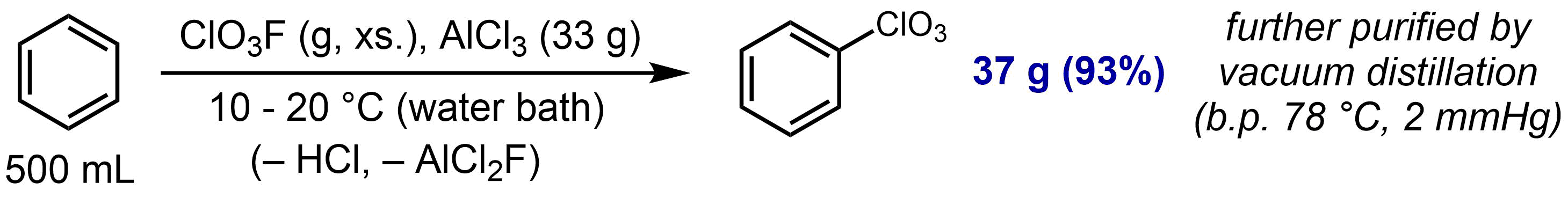

The compound is described as a somewhat shock-sensitive oily liquid. It exhibits low chemical reactivity and is inert towards acidic (HCl (aq.)) or reducing (LiAlH_{4}, H_{2}/Pd) conditions. However, it undergoes hydrolysis upon reflux in aqueous KOH to afford phenol, and undergoes aromatic nitration to afford the meta-nitration product, as expected for a strongly –I, –M substituent.

It and its derivatives have been investigated as novel energetic materials analogous to nitro compounds.

== See also ==
- Electrophilic aromatic substitution
- Nitrobenzene
- Phenylsulfur pentafluoride
- Hypervalent organoiodine compounds
