= (Diacetoxyiodo)benzene =

Names
- Preferred IUPAC name 1,1′-[(Phenyl-λ^{3}-iodanediyl)bis(oxy)]di(ethan-1-one)
- Other names Bis(acetoxy)(phenyl)iodane; Bis(acetato-O)phenyliodine; Bis(acetoxy)iodobenzene (BAIB) (Diacetoxyiodo)benzene; I,I-Diacetatoiodobenzene; Iodobenzene diacetate Iodosobenzene I,I-diacetate; Phenyliodine(III) diacetate (PIDA); Phenyliodo diacetate

Identifiers
CAS Number	3240-34-4
3D model (JSmol)	Interactive image
ChemSpider	69182
ECHA InfoCard	100.019.826
EC Number	221-808-1
PubChem CID	76724
UNII	AY2C9T5FRZ
CompTox Dashboard (EPA)	DTXSID0062929
- InChI: InChI=1S/C10H11IO4/c1-8(12)14-11(15-9(2)13)10-6-4-3-5-7-10/h3-7H,1-2H3 Key: ZBIKORITPGTTGI-UHFFFAOYSA-N
- SMILES: CC(=O)OI(C1=CC=CC=C1)OC(=O)C

Properties
Chemical formula	C_{10}H_{11}IO_{4}
Molar mass	322.098 g·mol^{−1}
Appearance	white powder
Melting point	163–165 °C (325–329 °F; 436–438 K)
Solubility in water	reacts
Solubility	soluble in acetic acid, acetonitrile, dichloromethane

Structure
Crystal structure	orthorhombic
Space group	Pnn2
Lattice constant	a = 15.693(3) Å, b = 8.477(2) Å, c = 8.762(2) Å
Molecular shape	T-shaped molecular geometry

Related compounds
Related compounds	(Bis(trifluoroacetoxy)iodo)benzene
- Except where otherwise noted, data are given for materials in their standard state (at 25 °C [77 °F], 100 kPa). Infobox references

(Diacetoxyiodo)benzene, also known as phenyliodine(III) diacetate (PIDA) is a hypervalent iodine chemical with the formula C_{6}H_{5}I(OCOCH_{3})_{2}. It is used as an oxidizing agent in organic chemistry.

== Preparation ==
This reagent was originally prepared by Conrad Willgerodt by reacting iodobenzene with a mixture of acetic acid and peracetic acid:

C_{6}H_{5}I + CH_{3}CO_{3}H + CH_{3}CO_{2}H → C_{6}H_{5}I(O_{2}CCH_{3})_{2} + H_{2}O

PIDA can also be prepared from iodosobenzene and glacial acetic acid:

C_{6}H_{5}IO + 2 CH_{3}CO_{2}H → C_{6}H_{5}I(O_{2}CCH_{3})_{2} + H_{2}O

More recent preparations direct from iodine, acetic acid, and benzene have been reported, using either sodium perborate or potassium peroxydisulfate as the oxidizing agent:

C_{6}H_{6} + I_{2} + 2 CH_{3}CO_{2}H + K_{2}S_{2}O_{8} → C_{6}H_{5}I(O_{2}CCH_{3})_{2} + KI + H_{2}SO_{4} + KHSO_{4}

The PIDA molecule is termed hypervalent as its iodine atom (technically a hypervalent iodine) is in its +3 oxidation state and has more than typical number of covalent bonds. It adopts a T-shaped molecular geometry, with the phenyl group occupying one of the three equatorial positions of a trigonal bipyramid (lone pairs occupy the other two) and the axial positions occupied by oxygen atoms from the acetate groups. The "T" is distorted in that the phenyl-C to I to acetate-O bond angles are less than 90°. A separate investigation of the crystal structure confirmed that it has orthorhombic crystals in space group Pnn2 and reported unit-cell dimensions in good agreement with the original paper. The bond lengths around the iodine atom were 2.08 Å to the phenyl carbon atom and equal 2.156 Å bonds to the acetate oxygen atoms. This second crystal structure determination explained the distortion in the geometry by noting the presence of two weaker intramolecular iodine–oxygen interactions, resulting in an "overall geometry of each iodine [that] can be described as a pentagonal-planar arrangement of three strong and two weak secondary bonds."

== Unconventional reactions ==
One use of PIDA is in the preparation of similar reagents by substitution of the acetate groups. For example, it can be used to prepare (bis(trifluoroacetoxy)iodo)benzene (phenyliodine(III) bis(trifluoroacetate), PIFA) by heating in trifluoroacetic acid:

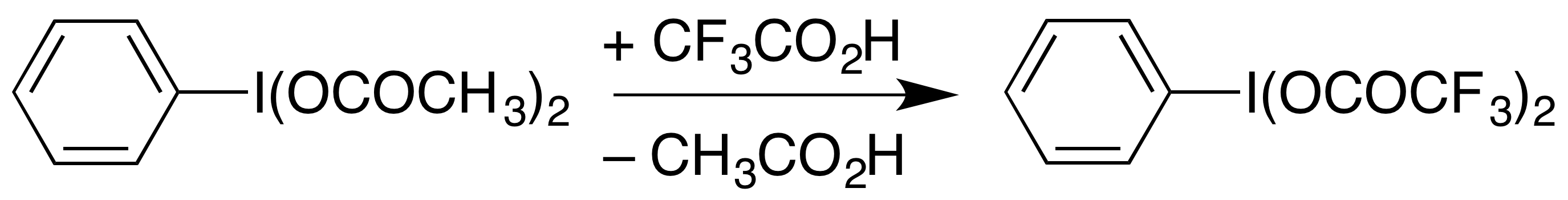

PIFA can be used to carry out the Hofmann rearrangement under mildly acidic conditions, rather than the strongly basic conditions traditionally used. The Hofmann decarbonylation of an N-protected asparagine has been demonstrated with PIDA, providing a route to β-amino-L-alanine derivatives.

PIDA is also used in Suárez oxidation, where photolysis of hydroxy compounds in the presence of PIDA and iodine generates cyclic ethers. This has been used in several total syntheses, such as the total synthesis of (−)-majucin, (−)-Jiadifenoxolane A, and cephanolide A.
