= Electrophilic aromatic substitution =

Chemical reaction which attaches an electrophile to an aromatic ring

Electrophilic aromatic substitution (S_{E}Ar) is an organic reaction in which an atom that is attached to an aromatic system (usually hydrogen) is replaced by an electrophile. Some of the most important electrophilic aromatic substitutions are aromatic nitration, aromatic halogenation, aromatic sulfonation, and Friedel-Crafts alkylation and acylation.

== Illustrative reactions ==

The most widely practised example of this reaction is benzene ethylation, en route to the commodity plastic polystyrene. Approximately 24,700,000 tons of ethylbenzene were produced in 1999. This process generally uses acids to generate the incipient carbocation.

Many other electrophilic reactions of benzene are conducted on smaller scale; they are valuable routes to key intermediates. The nitration of benzene is achieved via the action of the nitronium ion as the electrophile. Sulfonation with fuming sulfuric acid gives benzenesulfonic acid. Aromatic halogenation with bromine, chlorine, or iodine gives the corresponding aryl halides, typically catalyzed by the corresponding iron or aluminum trihalide. The Friedel–Crafts reaction can be performed either as an acylation or as an alkylation. Often, aluminium trichloride is used, but almost any strong Lewis acid can be applied, and acylation requires a stoichiometric amount of aluminum trichloride.

== Reaction mechanism ==

The overall reaction mechanism, denoted by the Hughes–Ingold mechanistic symbol S_{E}Ar, begins with the aromatic ring attacking the electrophile E^{+} (1). This step forms a delocalized, positively-charged, cyclohexadienyl cation, also known as an arenium ion, Wheland intermediate, or arene σ-complex (2). Many examples of this highly acidic carbocation have been characterized. Under normal conditions they donate the proton attached to the sp^{3} carbon to the solvent (or any other weak base) to reestablish aromaticity. On net, E replaces H on the aryl ring (3).

=== ipso attack and reversibility ===
Occasionally, electrofuges (groups that leave without their electron pair) beside H^{+} will depart in step (2→3). These species include silyl groups (SiR_{3}^{+}), sulfonic acid moieties (SO_{3}H^{+}), carboxylic acids (CO_{2} + H^{+}), the iodo group (I^{+}), and tertiary alkyl groups like t-butyl ((CH_{3})_{3}C^{+} etc.). The intentional use of these groups, typically silyl, to direct a substitution is sometimes referred to as ipso substitution. IUPAC considers "ipso substitution" synonymous with substitution and discourages the terminology.

Loss of iodo or alkyl groups is more often an undesired side reaction. Indeed, when the incoming electrophile is a simple proton, the net effect of ipso substitution is a reverse reaction, an electrophilic aromatic desubstitution.

Classic examples include:

- Nitration of salicylic acid forms picric acid. Nitration at the 2 position has CO_{2}H^{+} as the leaving group.
- Certain Friedel-Crafts alkylations are equilibrium reactions, transferring alkyl groups from one arene to another.
- In the Hayashi rearrangement, ipso substitution through a spiro intermediate results in transacylation.

== Effect of substituent groups ==
Diagram showing the ortho, meta and para positions relative to a substituent X on a benzene ring

Pre-existing substituents on a benzene ring affect both the regioselectivity and speed of an electrophilic aromatic substitution. Some groups (the ortho/para directors) promote substitution at the ortho or para positions, whereas other groups favor substitution at the meta position (respectively meta directors). These patterns can be rationalized through the presence of additional resonance structures. In all cases, regioselectivity is a kinetic effect. The very long-term reaction of a Friedel-Crafts equilibrium eventually gives an all-meta isomer, thermodynamically favored by sterics.

Likewise, some groups increase the overall reaction rate (activating groups) while others will decrease it (respectively deactivating). All known activating groups are ortho/para directors, but the reverse is not true. This is because the overall reaction rate is affected by both resonance stabilizations and inductive effects.

=== Reaction rate ===
Substituents can generally be divided into two classes: activating and deactivating the aromatic ring. Activating substituents stabilize the rate-determining cationic transition state, accelerating the reaction. They donate electrons into the ring system either inductively or mesomerically. Examples of activated aromatic rings are toluene, dimethylaniline, and phenol. In the former case, the electrons are donated through hyperconjugation, i.e. inductive donation. In the latter two cases, the electrons are donated from the lone pair(s), i.e. mesomeric donation.

The extra electron density is not delivered uniformly across the ring, but concentrates on atoms 2, 4 and 6. Thus activating substituents are also ortho/para directors (see § ortho/para directors).

On the other hand, deactivating substituents withdraw elections, destabilizing the intermediate cation and slowing the reaction rate. Generally harsher conditions are then required to drive the reaction to completion. An example of this is the nitration of toluene to trinitrotoluene (TNT). The first nitration, on the activated toluene ring, can be done at room temperature and with dilute acid. The second one already needs prolonged heating and more concentrated acid, and the third one, on very strongly deactivated dinitrotoluene, has to be done in boiling, concentrated sulfuric acid.

Groups that are electron-withdrawing may be either ortho/para or meta directors, depending on whether they withdraw electrons through resonance (most groups) or induction (the halogens).

=== ortho/para directors ===
Groups with unshared pairs of electrons, such as the amino group of aniline, are ortho/para-directing by resonance. These groups donate those unshared electrons to the π system, creating a negative charge at the ortho and para positions. For example, when the electrophile attacks the ortho and para positions of aniline, the nitrogen atom can form an additional iminium ion resonance structure not present in the analogous benzene reaction:

resonance structures for ortho attack of an electrophile on aniline

This substantially enhances the stability of the cationic intermediate.

The additional iminium resonance structure is not present during meta attack:

resonance structures for meta attack of an electrophile on aniline

Thus the ortho and para positions are most reactive towards an electron-poor electrophile.

Other substituents, such as alkyl and aryl substituents, may also donate electron density to the π system; however, since they lack an available unshared pair of electrons, their ability to do this is rather limited. They only weakly activate the ring and do not strongly disfavor the meta position.

Selectivity between ortho and para positions can rarely be predicted a priori. Steric hindrance typically (see § Steric effects) disfavor the ortho position, but there are two ortho positions for reaction but only one para position.

=== meta directors ===
Groups more electronegative than carbon, such as the trifluoromethyl group (-CF_{3}), withdraw substantial electron density from the π system. In some cases (halogens, nitroso monomers), donation from lone pairs counteracts the withdrawal. But otherwise the substituted ring carbon is made electron-poor, and any resonance structure in which it bears a positive charge destabilized. Since the positive charge is elsewhere in (and only in) meta attack, electron-withdrawing groups are meta directing.

=== pH sensitivity ===
Substituents can be converted from electron-withdrawing to electron-donating (or vice-versa) through protonation or deprotonation. The most common examples of these shifts occur with carboxylic acids (weakly electron-withdrawing when neutral, but weakly electron-donating when deprotonated to the carboxylate) and amines (strongly electron-donating when neutral, but strongly electron-withdrawing when protonated to the ammonium ion). Infamously, the direct nitration of aniline with mixed acid results in a 50/50 mixture of para- and meta-nitroaniline isomers. The uncharged, activated aniline (ArNH_{2}) gives the para isomer, but exists in equilibrium with a more abundant but less reactive anilinium ion (ArNH_{3}^{+}), from which the meta isomer. The traditional workaround for this problem is a protecting group: acetanilide reacts to solely the para and ortho isomers, which can then be hydrolyzed back to nitroaniline.

=== Steric effects ===
Although discussions of directing groups usually focus on electronic effects (e.g. EWG vs EDGs), steric effects can prove influential. Toluene nitration gives approximately 2:1 ortho vs para-nitrotoluene. In the case of tert-butylbenzene, however, the selectivity is reversed: 73% of the product is 4-nitro-tert-butybenzene.

In directed ortho metalation, a Lewis-basic activating group chelates a metal electrophile, forcing ortho substitution.

== Heteroarenes ==
=== Heterocycles with a conjugated lone pair ===
Furans, thiophenes, and pyrroles are all more susceptible to electrophilic attack than benzene. These compounds all contain an atom with an unshared pair of electrons (oxygen, sulfur, or nitrogen) as a member of the aromatic ring, which substantially stabilizes the cationic intermediate.

Examples of electrophilic substitutions to pyrrole are the Pictet–Spengler reaction and the Bischler–Napieralski reaction.

=== Basic or positively-charged heterocycles ===
Positively-charged heterocycles (e.g. pyrylium, cobaltocenium) never undergo electrophilic substitution: electrostatic repulsion destabilizes any doubly-charged Wheland intermediate. Likewise, electrophilic substitution on unsubstituted pyridine, imidazole, or similar aromatic bases is almost impossible, because the acid catalysts typically complex the arenes much more rapidly than the desired electrophile can attack.

The traditional protecting group for basic heterocycles is the N-oxide. In addition to being nonbasic, the N-oxide is mesomerically activating, similar to a phenol.

== Asymmetric electrophilic aromatic substitution ==
Electrophilic aromatic substitutions with prochiral carbon electrophiles have been adapted for asymmetric synthesis by switching to chiral Lewis acid catalysts especially in Friedel–Crafts type reactions. An early example concerns the addition of chloral to phenols catalyzed by aluminium chloride modified with (–)-menthol. A glyoxylate compound has been added to N,N-dimethylaniline with a chiral bisoxazoline ligand–copper(II) triflate catalyst system also in a Friedel–Crafts hydroxyalkylation:

Asymmetric Friedel–Crafts hydroxyalkylation

In another alkylation N-methylpyrrole reacts with crotonaldehyde catalyzed by trifluoroacetic acid modified with a chiral imidazolidinone:

Friedel Crafts Asymmetric Addition To Pyrrole

Indole reacts with an enamide catalyzed by a chiral BINOL derived phosphoric acid:

Friedel Crafts Alkylation Indole Asymmetric

In the presence of 10–20 % chiral catalyst, 80–90% ee is achievable.

== Possible electrophiles ==
Unsubstituted arenes are weak nucleophiles, and competent electrophiles generally require an acid catalyst to form. The simplest electrophilic aromatic substitution is an aromatic halogenation, in which a metal halide catalyzes halonium ion attack on the arene.

Those halogenation conditions were famously later adapted to organic electrophiles in the Friedel–Crafts reaction and its descendents. An alkyl halide or carbonyl compound reacts with aluminum chloride to form an electrophilic carbocation, in the latter case stabilized as an acylium or ketonium ion. In the Houben-Hoesch reaction, a zinc halide catalyzes an analogous nitrilium electrophile.

Electrophilic formylation is not entirely straightforward, since carbon monoxide complexes are rarely electrophilic and formyl chloride decomposes well below most EAS temperatures. Nevertheless, Friedel-Crafts variants for that product include the Gattermann-Koch (also nitrilium electrophile), Reimer–Tiemann (respectively dichlorocarbene), and Vilsmeier–Haack reactions (chloroiminium ion).

In aromatic nitration, the nitronium ion attacks an arene. Other, weaker, nitrogen-derived electrophiles include nitrosonium (for aromatic nitrosation) and nitrosamines, as in the Lehmstedt–Tanasescu reaction. Aromatic diazonium salts are electrophilic at the terminal nitrogen, famously reacting in diazonium coupling.

The electrophile in aromatic sulfonation is sulfur trioxide or protonated chlorosulfonic acid (H_{2}SO_{3}Cl^{+}). Similar but less common reactions between an arene and a halo- or oxyacid are known with other sulfur compounds, and with phosphorus (e.g. synthesis of dichlorophenylphosphine), chlorine (electrophilic perchlorylation), arsenic (the Bechamp reaction), mercury (mercuration), and thallium (thallation).

Some organometallic electrophilic substitutions are quite different from the other electrophilic aromatic substitutions, occurring under strongly basic conditions. The simplest case is the Kolbe–Schmitt reaction, in which a highly nucleophilic phenolate ion captures the weak electrophile carbon dioxide.

The quenching of a metal-stabilized arene carbanion is formally electrophilic replacement of the counterion. Thus a wide variety of transmetalations are arguably electrophilic aromatic substitutions, as is the deprotonation of acidic arenes by carbanion bases (e.g. phenyllithium from butyllithium).

Likewise, when aliphatic carbenes and carbenoids insert into arene C−H bonds the process is technically an electrophilic aromatic substitution.

== See also ==
- Electrophilic halogenation
- Nucleophilic aromatic substitution
- Minisci reaction (radical aromatic substitution)
