= Iodosobenzene =

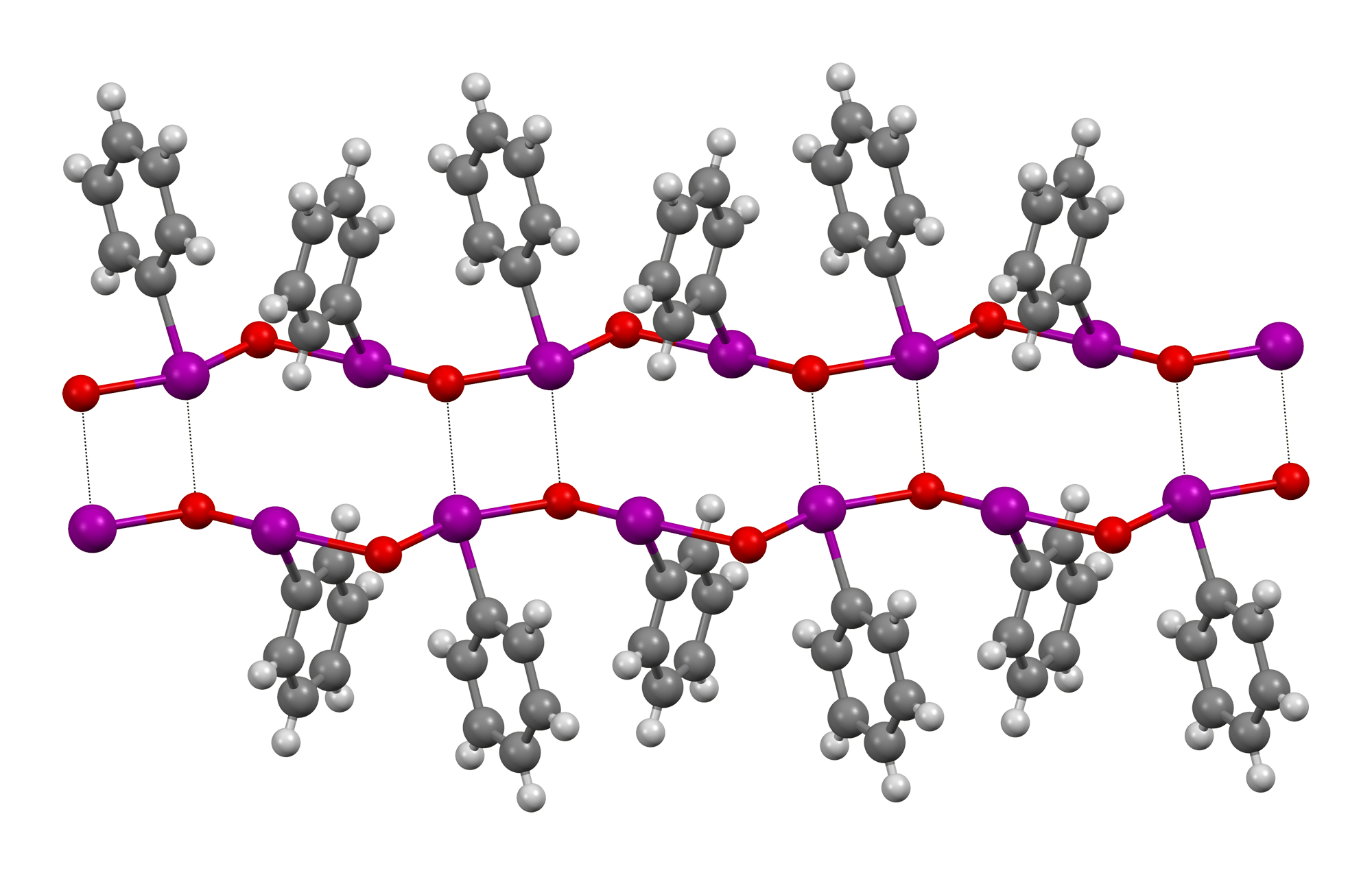

Names
- Preferred IUPAC name Iodosylbenzene
- Other names Iodosobenzene

Identifiers
CAS Number	536-80-1
3D model (JSmol)	Interactive image
ChemSpider	83171
ECHA InfoCard	100.007.864
EC Number	208-648-8
PubChem CID	92125
UNII	TWW7V7Q50P
CompTox Dashboard (EPA)	DTXSID1060213
- InChI: InChI=1S/C6H5IO/c8-7-6-4-2-1-3-5-6/h1-5H Key: JYJVVHFRSFVEJM-UHFFFAOYSA-N; InChI=1/C6H5IO/c8-7-6-4-2-1-3-5-6/h1-5H Key: JYJVVHFRSFVEJM-UHFFFAOYAR
- SMILES: c1ccc(cc1)I=O

Properties
Chemical formula	C_{6}H_{5}IO
Molar mass	220.01 g/mol
Appearance	colourless solid
Density	1.229 g cm^{−3}
Melting point	210 ˚C
Solubility in water	poor

Hazards
- GHS labelling
Pictograms	(GHS02: Flammable) (GHS03: Oxidizing) (GHS07: Exclamation mark)
Signal word	Danger
Hazard statements	H228, H271, H315, H319, H335
Precautionary statements	P210, P220, P240, P241, P261, P264, P264+P265, P271, P280, P283, P302+P352, P304+P340, P305+P351+P338, P306+P360, P319, P321, P332+P317, P337+P317, P362+P364, P370+P378, P371+P380+P375, P403+P233, P405, P420, P501
- Except where otherwise noted, data are given for materials in their standard state (at 25 °C [77 °F], 100 kPa). verify (what is ?) Infobox references

Iodosobenzene or iodosylbenzene is an organoiodine compound with the empirical formula C_{6}H_{5}IO. This colourless solid compound is used as an oxo transfer reagent in research laboratories examining organic and coordination chemistry.

== Preparation and structure ==
Iodosobenzene is prepared from iodobenzene. It is prepared by first oxidizing iodobenzene by peracetic acid. Hydrolysis of resulting diacetate affords "PhIO":

C_{6}H_{5}I + CH_{3}CO_{3}H + CH_{3}CO_{2}H → C_{6}H_{5}I(O_{2}CCH_{3})_{2} + H_{2}O
C_{6}H_{5}I(O_{2}CCH_{3})_{2} + H_{2}O → C_{6}H_{5}IO + 2 CH_{3}CO_{2}H

The structure of iodosobenzene has been verified by crystallographically. Related derivatives are also oligomeric. Its low solubility in most solvents and vibrational spectroscopy indicate that it is not molecular, but is polymeric, consisting of –I–O–I–O– chains. The related diacetate, C_{6}H_{5}I(O_{2}CCH_{3})_{2}, illustrates the ability of iodine(III) to adopt a T-shaped geometry without multiple bonds. Theoretical studies show that the bonding between the iodine and oxygen atoms in iodosobenzene represents a single dative I-O sigma bond, confirming the absence of the double I=O bond.

A monomeric derivative iodosylbenzene is known in the form of 2-(tert-butylsulfonyl)iodosylbenzene, a yellow solid. C-I-O angle is 94.78°, C-I and I-O distances are 2.128 and 1.848 Å.

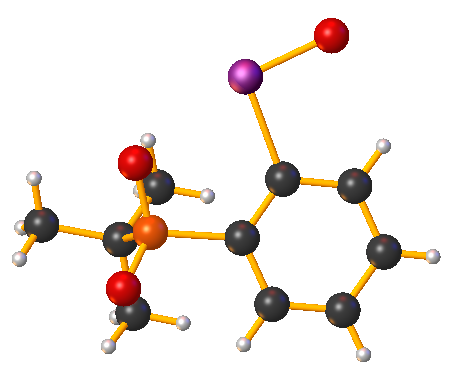
Structure of 2-(tert-butylsulfonyl)iodosylbenzene.

== Applications ==
Iodosobenzene has no commercial uses, but in the laboratory it is employed as an "oxo-transfer reagent." It epoxidizes certain alkenes and converts some metal complexes into the corresponding oxo derivatives. Although it is an oxidant, it is also mildly nucleophilic. These oxo-transfer reactions operate by the intermediacy of adducts PhI=O→M, which release PhI.

A mixture of iodosobenzene and sodium azide in acetic acid converts alkenes to vicinal diazides:.

R_{2}C=CR_{2} + 2 NaN_{3} + PhIO + 2 AcOH → (N_{3})R_{2}C−CR_{2}(N_{3}) + PhI + 2 AcONa + H_{2}O

== Safety ==
This compound is explosive and should not be heated under vacuum.

== See also ==
- Dess-Martin reagent
