= C7H5FO2 =

The molecular formula C_{7}H_{5}FO_{2} (molar mass: 140.11 g/mol) may refer to:

- Fluorobenzoic acids
  - 2-Fluorobenzoic acid
  - 3-Fluorobenzoic acid
  - 4-Fluorobenzoic acid
