= Benzenediazonium tetrafluoroborate =

Organic compound containing an –N≡N^{+} function

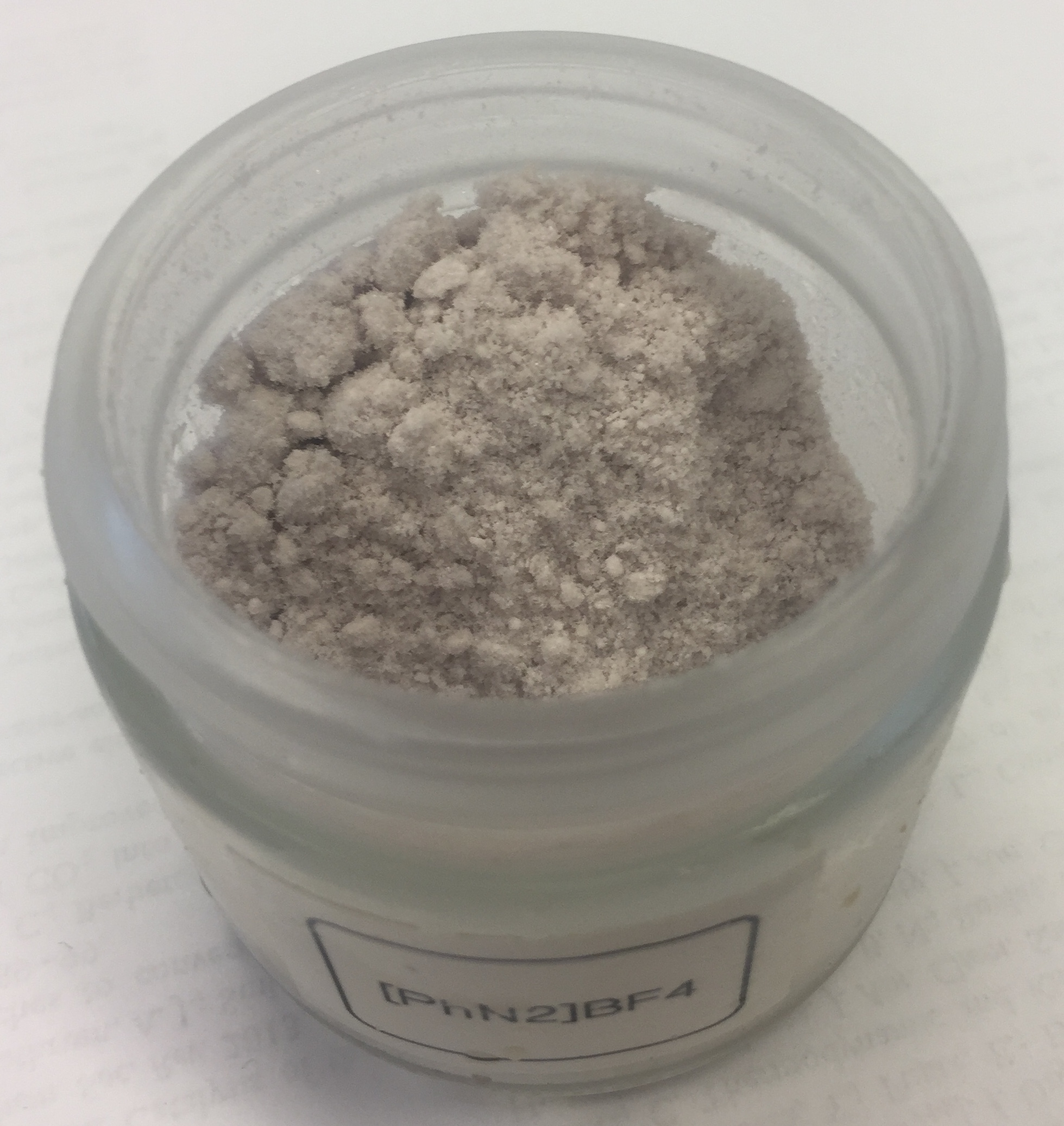

Names
- IUPAC name Benzenediazonium tetrafluoroborate
- Other names Phenyldiazonium tetrafluoroborate

Identifiers
CAS Number	369-57-3
3D model (JSmol)	Interactive image
ChemSpider	4447548
EC Number	820-352-6
PubChem CID	5284485
CompTox Dashboard (EPA)	DTXSID5021467
- InChI: InChI=1S/C6H5N2.BF4/c7-8-6-4-2-1-3-5-6;2-1(3,4)5/h1-5H;/q+1;-1 Key: JNCLVGMBRSKDED-UHFFFAOYSA-N
- SMILES: [B-](F)(F)(F)F.C1=CC=C(C=C1)[N+]#N

Properties
Chemical formula	C_{6}H_{5}BF_{4}N_{2}
Molar mass	191.92 g·mol^{−1}
Appearance	colorless crystals
Density	1.565 g/cm^{3}
Melting point	77 °C (171 °F; 350 K)
Boiling point	Decomposes at 91 °C (196 °F; 364 K)
- Except where otherwise noted, data are given for materials in their standard state (at 25 °C [77 °F], 100 kPa). (what is ?) Infobox references

Benzenediazonium tetrafluoroborate is an organic compound with the formula [C_{6}H_{5}N_{2}]BF_{4}. It is a salt of a diazonium cation and tetrafluoroborate. It exists as a colourless solid that is soluble in polar solvents. It is the parent member of the aryldiazonium compounds, which are widely used in organic chemistry.

== Synthesis ==
Diazotization of aniline with nitrous acid in the presence of hydrochloric acid gives phenyldiazonium chloride:

C_{6}H_{5}NH_{2} + HNO_{2} + HCl → [C_{6}H_{5}N_{2}]Cl + 2 H_{2}O

The required nitrous acid can be generated in situ by combining sodium nitrite and hydrochloric acid. The tetrafluoroborate salt of phenyl diazonium can be obtained from benzenediazonium chloride by salt metathesis using tetrafluoroboric acid.

[C_{6}H_{5}N_{2}]Cl + HBF_{4} → [C_{6}H_{5}N_{2}]BF_{4} + HCl

The tetrafluoroborate is more stable than the chloride.

== Properties ==
The diazo group (N_{2}) can be replaced by many other groups, usually anions, giving a variety of substituted phenyl derivatives:

C_{6}H_{5}N_{2}^{+} + Nu^{−} → C_{6}H_{5}Nu + N_{2}

These transformations are associated with many named reactions including the Schiemann reaction, Sandmeyer reaction, and Gomberg–Bachmann reaction. A wide range of groups that can be used to replace N_{2} including halide, SH^{−}, CO_{2}H^{−}, OH^{−}. Of considerable practical value in the dye industry are the diazo coupling reactions.

Reaction with aniline gives 1,3-diphenyltriazene.

The structure of the salt has been verified by X-ray crystallography. The N-N bond distance is 1.083(3) Å.

== Safety ==
While tetrafluoroborate salts are typically less sensitive than chlorides, all aryldiazonium salts should be assumed to pose a risk of explosion "unless proved otherwise".

Benzenediazonium tetrafluoroborate has been described as shock-insensitive, and, when dry, decomposes smoothly upon heating. It is less sensitive than benzenediazonium chloride, which is liable to detonate upon exposure to heat, friction, or shock.
