= Tropylium tetrafluoroborate =

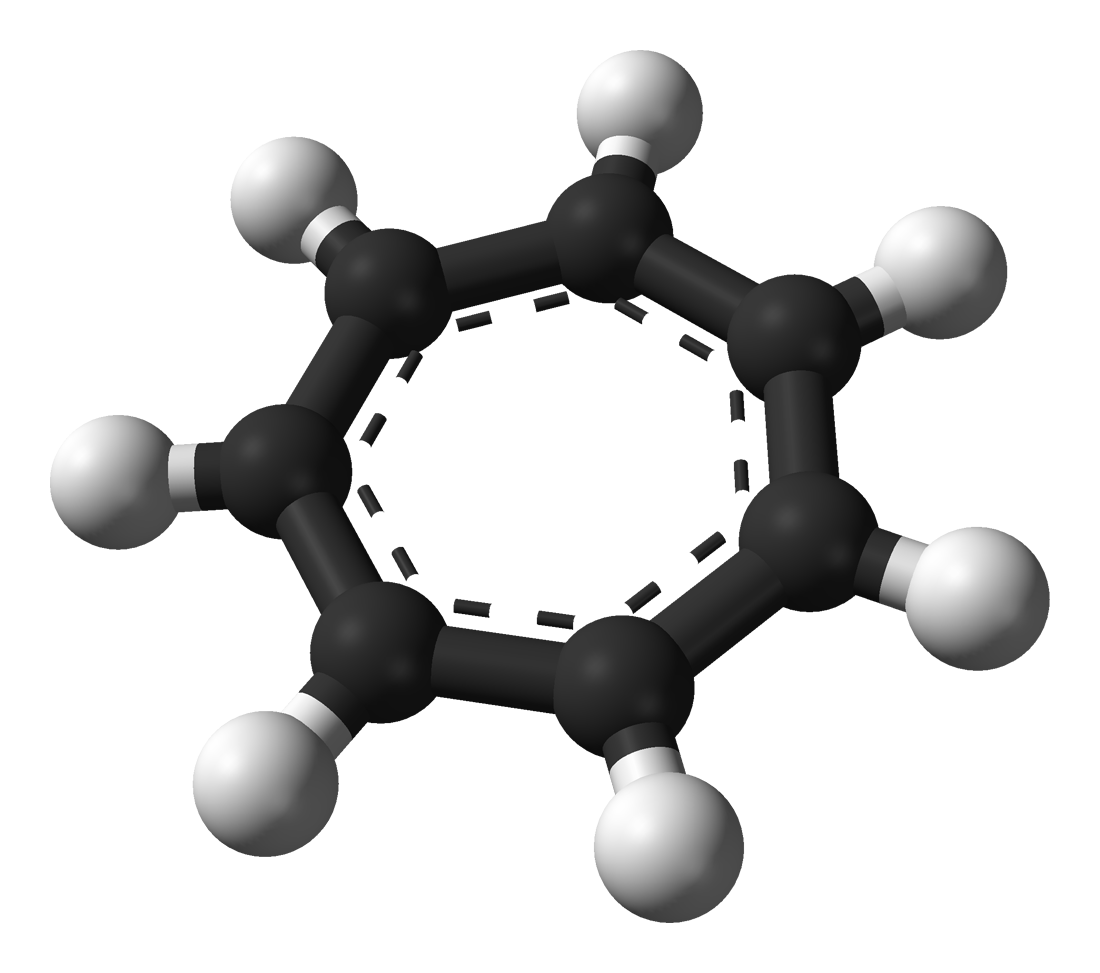

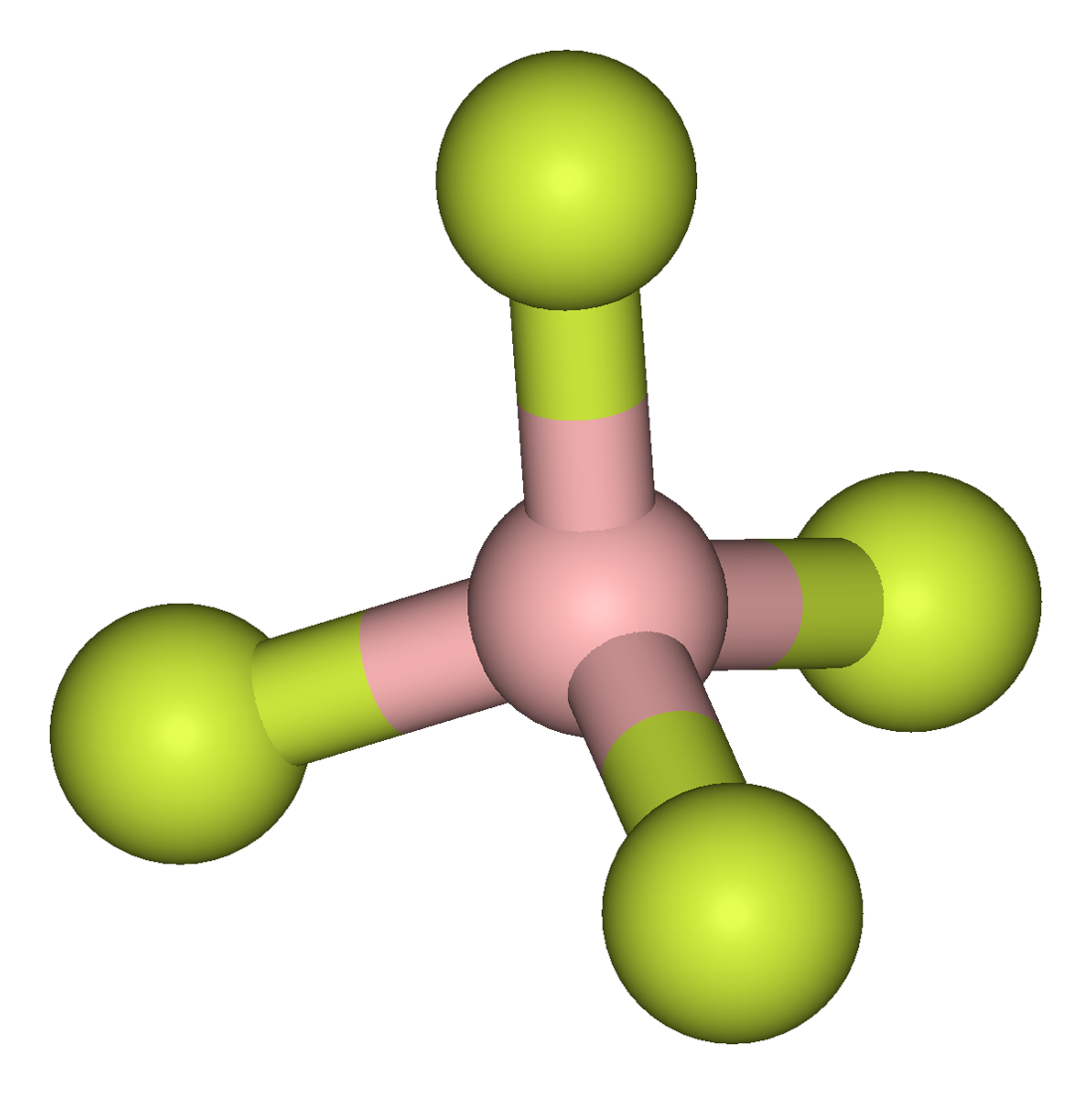

Names
- Preferred IUPAC name Cycloheptatrienylium tetrafluoroboranuide
- Other names Cycloheptatrienyl tetrafluoroborate

Identifiers
CAS Number	27081-10-3
3D model (JSmol)	Interactive image
ChemSpider	134784
ECHA InfoCard	100.043.816
EC Number	248-214-5
PubChem CID	152926
UNII	DFS83J4CRL
CompTox Dashboard (EPA)	DTXSID301068844
- InChI: InChI=1S/C7H7.BF4/c1-2-4-6-7-5-3-1;2-1(3,4)5/h1-7H;/q+1;-1 Key: SQVQHTIKOZVGLR-UHFFFAOYSA-N
- SMILES: F[B-](F)(F)F.c1[cH+]ccccc1

Properties
Chemical formula	[C_{7}H_{7}]^{+}[BF_{4}]^{−}
Molar mass	177.94 g·mol^{−1}
Appearance	white solid
Melting point	200 °C (392 °F; 473 K) decomposition

Hazards
- GHS labelling
Pictograms	(GHS05: Corrosive)
Signal word	Danger
Hazard statements	H314
Precautionary statements	P260, P264, P280, P301+P330+P331, P303+P361+P353, P304+P340, P305+P351+P338, P310, P321, P363, P405, P501

Related compounds
Other anions	Tetrafluoroborate
Other cations	Tropylium
- Except where otherwise noted, data are given for materials in their standard state (at 25 °C [77 °F], 100 kPa). Infobox references

Tropylium tetrafluoroborate is an organic compound with the formula [C_{7}H_{7}]^{+}[BF_{4}]^{−}. Containing the tropylium cation and the non-coordinating tetrafluoroborate counteranion, tropylium tetrafluoroborate is a rare example of a readily isolable carbocation. It is a white solid.

This compound may be prepared by the reaction of cycloheptatriene with phosphorus pentachloride, followed by tetrafluoroboric acid.

== See also ==
- Triphenylmethyl chloride, also known as trityl chloride.
