= Fluorobenzoic acid =

Fluorobenzoic acid may refer to:

- 2-Fluorobenzoic acid (ortho)
- 3-Fluorobenzoic acid (meta)
- 4-Fluorobenzoic acid (para)
