= 4-Fluorobenzoic acid =

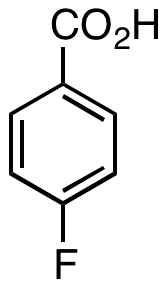

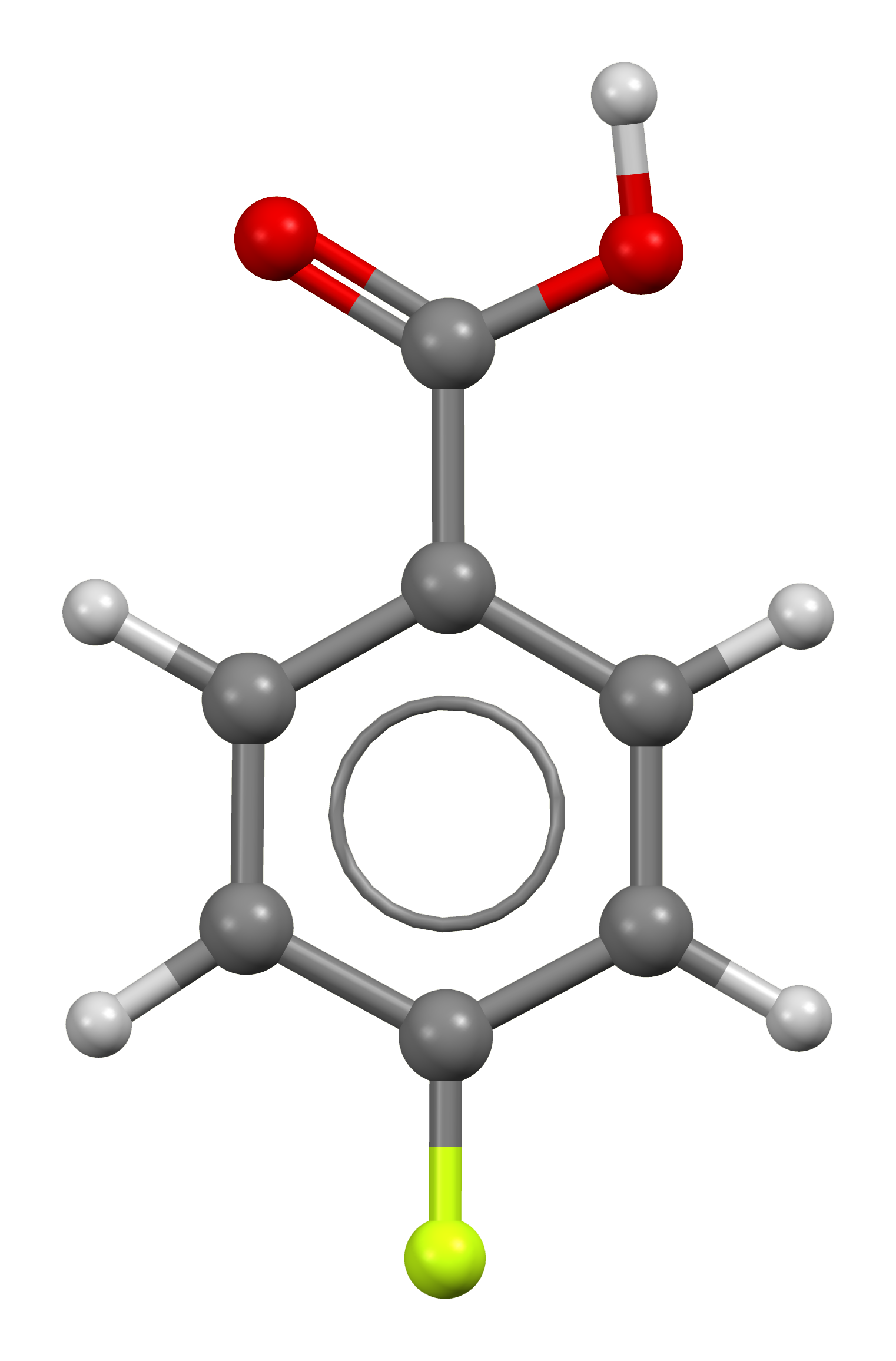

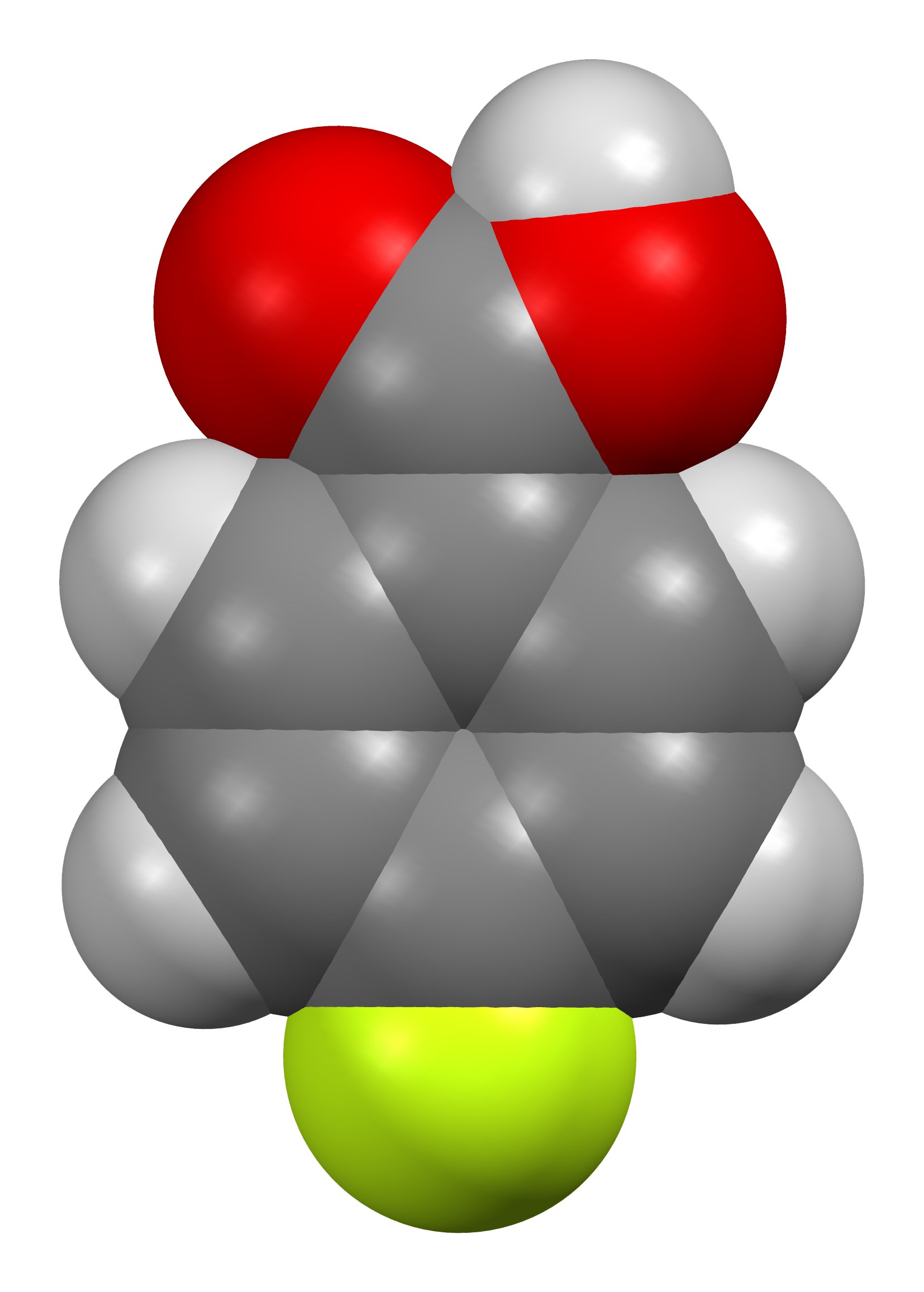

Names
- Preferred IUPAC name 4-Fluorobenzoic acid
- Other names p-fluorobenzoic acid, para-fluorobenzoic acid, 4-fluoro-benzoic acid

Identifiers
CAS Number	456-22-4
3D model (JSmol)	Interactive image
ChEBI	CHEBI:20364
ChemSpider	9579
ECHA InfoCard	100.006.600
EC Number	207-259-0
PubChem CID	9973
UNII	V5ROO2HOU4
CompTox Dashboard (EPA)	DTXSID9060023
- InChI: InChI=1S/C7H5FO2/c8-6-3-1-5(2-4-6)7(9)10/h1-4H,(H,9,10)
- SMILES: O=C(O)c1ccc(F)cc1

Properties
Chemical formula	C_{7}H_{5}FO_{2}
Molar mass	140.113 g·mol^{−1}
Appearance	white solid
Density	1.479 g/cm^{3}
Melting point	184 °C (363 °F; 457 K)
Boiling point	253.687 °C (488.637 °F; 526.837 K) at 760 mmHg
Solubility in water	1200 mg/L
log P	2.07
Acidity (pK_{a})	4.14

Hazards
- Occupational safety and health (OHS/OSH)
Main hazards	Irritates lungs, eyes, skin
- GHS labelling
Pictograms	(GHS05: Corrosive) (GHS07: Exclamation mark)
Signal word	Danger
Hazard statements	H302, H318
Precautionary statements	P264, P270, P280, P301+P312, P305+P351+P338, P310, P330, P501
Flash point	107.226 °C (225.007 °F; 380.376 K)
- Except where otherwise noted, data are given for materials in their standard state (at 25 °C [77 °F], 100 kPa). Infobox references

4-Fluorobenzoic acid (p-fluorobenzoic acid) is an isomer of fluorobenzoic acid (FBA), an organic compound with the formula C_{7}H_{5}FO_{2}. This colourless solid is a derivative of benzoic acid carboxylic acid. It is a synthetic intermediate.

== Preparation ==
4-Fluorobenzoic acid is commercially available. It may be prepared via the Schiemann reaction, in which a 4-aminobenzoic acid, protected as the ethyl ester, is diazotised and then fluoride introduced using tetrafluoroborate. Hydrolysis of the ester converts it back to the free acid.

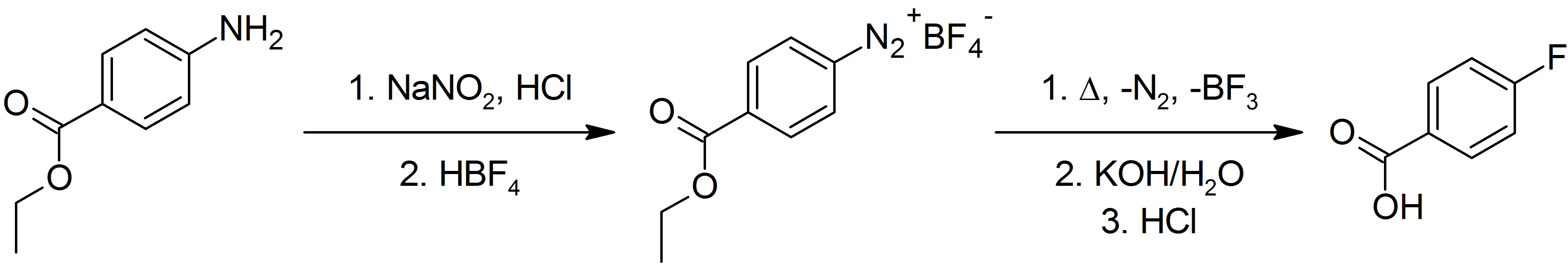

4-Fluorobenzoic acid has been observed to form by the aerobic biotransformation of 4-fluorocinnamic acid.

== See also ==
- 2-Fluorobenzoic acid, the ortho isomer
- 3-Fluorobenzoic acid, the meta isomer
