= Triazenes =

Organic compounds with a diazoamino group

Dacarbazine is a triazene used in the treatment of melanoma and Hodgkin's lymphoma.

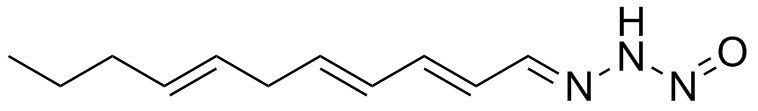
Triacsin C is a triazene made by certain bacteria species.

Triazenes are organic compounds that contain the functional group R^{1}−N=N−NR^{2}R^{3}, where the R are each any of various types of substituent groups. Some medications and dyes are triazenes. Formally, the triazenes are related to the unstable chemical triazene, H_{2}N−N=NH.

== Production ==
Triazenes are prepared from the N-coupling reaction between diazonium salts and primary or secondary amines. The coupling reactions are typically mild, using a base such as sodium acetate, sodium carbonate, or sodium bicarbonate.

The diazonium reagents are themselves available starting from amines. For symmetrical triazenes derived from primary amines, partial diazotization gives a mixture of the original amine and its diazo derivative that then couple with each other. For example, 1,3-diphenyltriazene (PhN=N−NHPh) can be made from aniline in a one-pot reaction. For asymmetrical triazenes, for example (phenyldiazenyl)pyrrolidine (PhN=N−NC_{4}H_{8}), the phenyldiazonium salt must be pre-made.

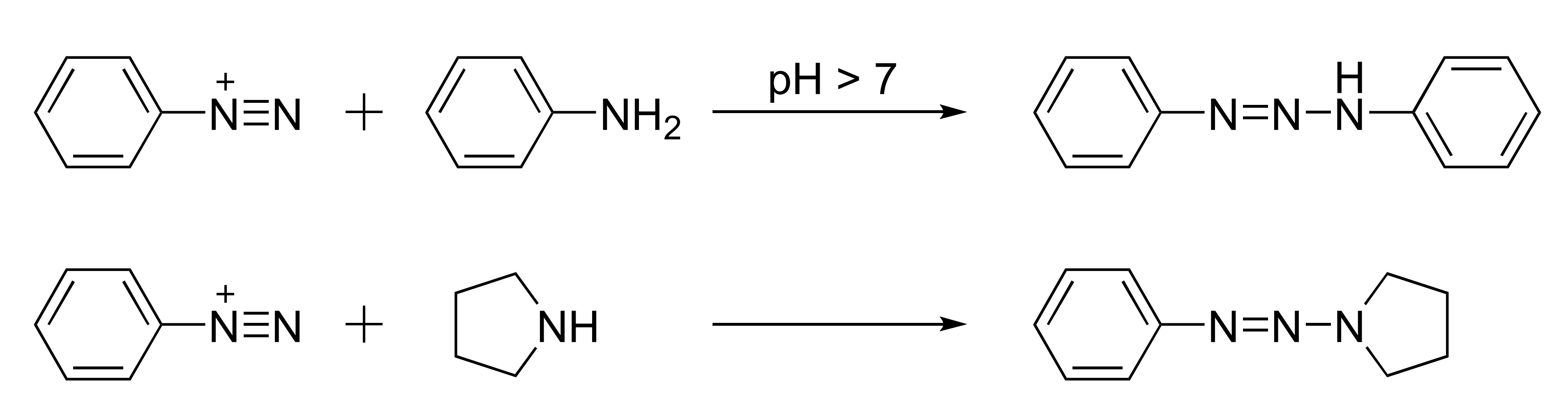

Analogues of Tröger's base containing a symmetric pair of asymmetric triazene side-chains have been obtained similarly.

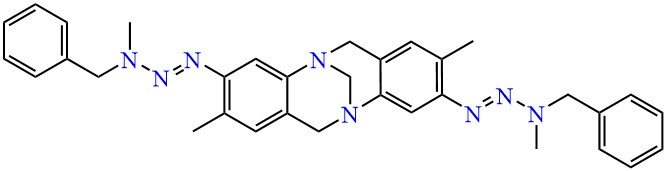

== Reactions and applications ==
Polymeric triazenes are applied as conductive and absorbent materials.

Triazenes are bidentate ligands, reacting to form either a four-membered ring or a dinuclear 8-membered ring. They have been used in the synthesis of cinnoline, functionalized lactams, and coumarins.

In the presence of protonating or alkylating agents, triazenes decompose into ammonium and diazonium salts. For example, triazenes have been used as in situ diazonium in thiophenol synthesis:

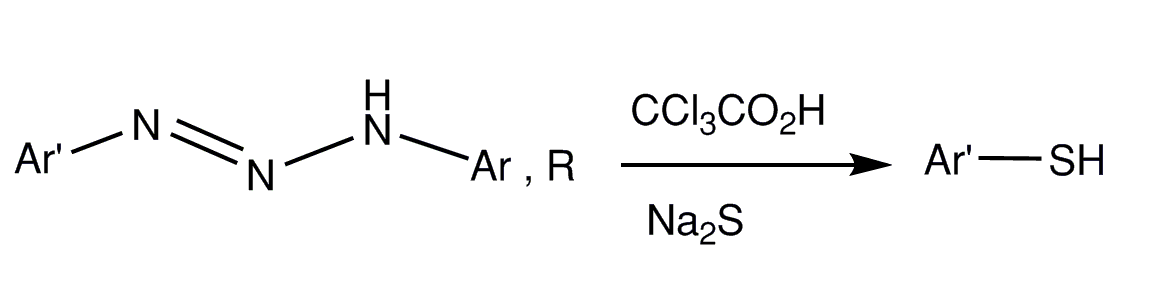
Triazenes used in the synthesis of thiophenols. Trichloroacetamide coproduct not shown.

A strategy for the protection and deprotection of sensitive secondary amines is also based on this principle.

Triazenes derived from primary amines engage in tautomerism:

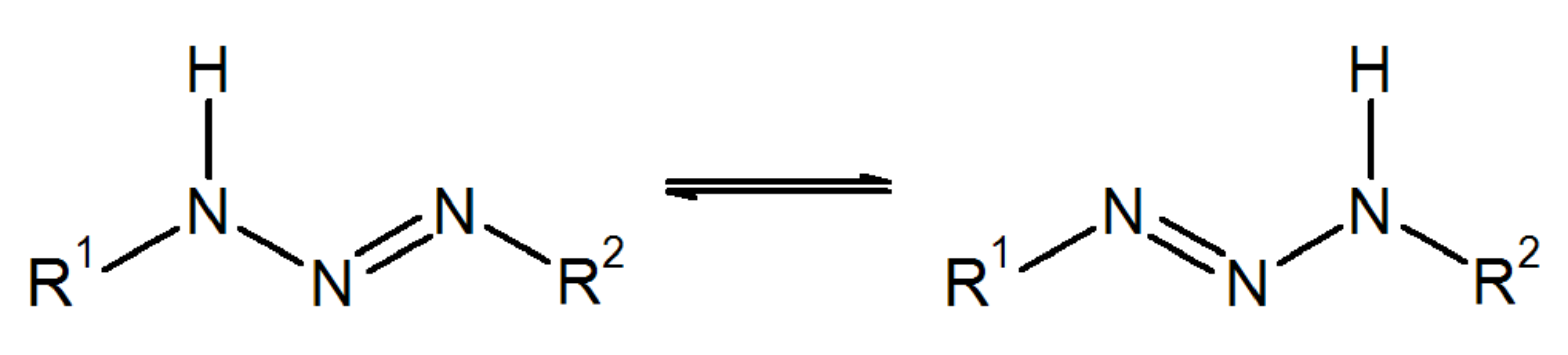

(The tautomers are identical for symmetric triazenes.)

Oxidation generates the highly electrophilic azidium intermediate cation:

R-N=N-NH-R + tBuOCl → [R-N=N^{+}=N-R] + HOtBu + Cl^{−} → ...
