= Pschorr cyclization =

Reaction in organic chemistry

Named after	Robert Pschorr
Reaction type	Ring forming reaction

Reaction
biaryl with diazonium group
tricyclic biaryl

Identifiers
Organic Chemistry Portal	pschorr-reaction

Conditions
Catalyst	copper

The Pschorr cyclization is a name reaction in organic chemistry, which was named after its discoverer, the German chemist Robert Pschorr (1868-1930). It describes the intramolecular substitution of aromatic compounds via aryldiazonium salts as intermediates and is catalyzed by copper. The reaction is a variant of the Gomberg-Bachmann reaction. The following reaction scheme shows the Pschorr cyclization for the example of phenanthrene:

Pschorr-Cyclisierung

== Reaction mechanism ==
In the course of the Pschorr cyclization, a diazotization of the starting compound occurs, so that an aryldiazonium salt is formed as intermediate. For this, sodium nitrite is added to hydrochloric acid to obtain nitrous acid. The nitrous acid is protonated and reacts with another equivalent of nitrous acid to the intermediate 1 which is later used for the diazotization of the aromatic amine:

Erster Teil des Reaktionsmechanismus der Pschorr-Cyclisierung

The intermediate 1 reacts in the following way with the starting compound:

Zweiter Teil des Reaktionsmechanismus der Pschorr-Cyclisierung

Intermediate 1 replaces a hydrogen atom from the amino group of the starting compound. A nitroso group is introduced as new substituent, producing under the release of nitrous acid intermediate 2. Intermediate 2 then reacts via a tautomerism and dehydration to the aryldiazonium cation 3.

Dritter Teil des Reaktionsmechanismus der Pschorr-Cyclisierung

Nitrogen is then cleaved from the aryldiazonium cation 3 by the use of the copper catalyst. The aryl radical thus formed reacts via ring closure to the intermediate stage 4. Finally, rearomatization takes place using again the copper catalyst and phenanthrene is formed.

== Atom economy ==
The Pschorr cyclization has a relatively good atom economy, since essentially only nitrogen is produced as a waste material. For the diazotization, two equivalents of nitrous acid are used, of which one equivalent is being re-formed in the course of the reaction. The copper is used in catalytic amounts only and does therefore not affect the atomic efficiency of the reaction. However, when considering the atom economy it has to be mentioned that the Pschorr cyclization has often only low yields.
