= C12H11N3 =

The molecular formula C_{12}H_{11}N_{3} (molar mass: 197.24 g/mol, exact mass: 197.0953 u) may refer to:

- Aniline Yellow, a yellow azo dye and an aromatic amine
- 1,3-Diphenyltriazene, organic compound
