= Balz–Schiemann reaction =

Chemical reaction

Balz-Schiemann reaction
Named after	Günther Balz; Günther Schiemann
Reaction type	Substitution reaction

Identifiers
Organic Chemistry Portal	balz-schiemann-reaction
RSC ontology ID	RXNO:0000127

The Balz–Schiemann reaction (also called the Schiemann reaction) is a chemical reaction in which an aryl diazonium salt is transformed to an aryl fluoride. This reaction is a traditional route to fluorobenzene and some related derivatives, including 4-fluorobenzoic acid. Traditionally, the diazonium tetrafluoroborate is prepared from an aniline derivative by diazotization using NaNO_{2} and fluoroboric acid (aq. HBF_{4}). The isolated diazonium tetrafluoroborate is then heated to temperatures up to 200 °C after mixing the compound with sand or slurrying it in a high boiling paraffin in order to ensure even heating and to disperse the large amount of heat and gases generated.

Balz-Schliemann reaction

The reaction is conceptually similar to the Sandmeyer reaction, which converts diazonium salts to other aryl halides (ArCl, ArBr). However, while the Sandmeyer reaction involves a copper reagent/catalyst and radical intermediates, the thermal decomposition of the diazonium tetrafluoroborate proceeds without a promoter and is believed to generate highly unstable aryl cations (Ar^{+}), which abstract F^{−} from BF_{4}^{−} to give the fluoroarene (ArF), along with boron trifluoride and nitrogen as the byproducts.

== Innovations ==
The traditional Balz–Schiemann reaction employs HBF_{4} and involves isolation of the diazonium salt. Both aspects can be profitably modified. Other counterions have been used in place of tetrafluoroborates, such as hexafluorophosphates (PF_{6}^{−}) and hexafluoroantimonates (SbF_{6}^{−}) with improved yields for some substrates. The diazotization reaction can be effected with nitrosonium salts such as [NO]SbF_{6} or tert-butyl nitrite without isolation of the diazonium intermediate. The reaction has also performed under continuous flow conditions, allowing the potentially hazardous aryl diazonium salt to be prepared and immediately consumed inline without accumulating or isolating it.

As a practical matter, the traditional Balz–Schiemann reaction consumes relatively expensive BF_{4}^{−} as a source of fluoride. An alternative methodology produces the fluoride salt of the diazonium compound. In this implementation, the diazotization is conducted with a solution of sodium nitrite in liquid hydrogen fluoride:

ArNH_{2} + 2 HF + NaNO_{2} → [ArN_{2}]F + NaF + 2 H_{2}O
[ArN_{2}]F → ArF + N_{2}

== History ==
The reaction is named after the German chemists Günther Schiemann and Günther Balz.

== Examples ==
4-Fluorotoluene is made in ~89% yield by Balz–Schiemann reaction on p-toluidine. This is then used as a precursor for 4-fluorobenzaldehyde,

== Additional literature ==
- Roe A (1949). "Preparation of Aromatic Fluorine Compounds from Diazonium Fluoborates". Org. React. 5: 193. doi:10.1002/0471264180.or005.04. ISBN 0-471-26418-0.
- Becker H. G. O., Israel G. (1978). "Ionenpaareffekte bei der Photolyse und Thermolyse von Aryldiazonium-tetrafluoroboraten". J. Prakt. Chem. 321 (4): 579–586. doi:10.1002/prac.19793210410.
