= Borepin =

Aromatic, boron-containing rings

Names
- IUPAC name 1H-borepine

Identifiers
CAS Number	291-62-3
3D model (JSmol)	Interactive image
ChemSpider	26666607
PubChem CID	14970100
CompTox Dashboard (EPA)	DTXSID001045782
- InChI: InChI=1S/C6H7B/c1-2-4-6-7-5-3-1/h1-7H Key: LYCCRAPWFYEFFC-UHFFFAOYSA-N
- SMILES: B1C=CC=CC=C1

Properties
Chemical formula	C_{6}H_{7}B
Molar mass	89.93 g/mol
- Except where otherwise noted, data are given for materials in their standard state (at 25 °C [77 °F], 100 kPa). Infobox references

Borepins are a class of boron-containing heterocycles used in main group chemistry. They consist of a seven-membered unsaturated ring with a tricoordinate boron in it. Simple borepins are analogues of cycloheptatriene, which is a seven-membered ring containing three carbon-carbon double bonds, each of which contributes 2π electrons for a total of 6π electrons. Unlike other seven-membered systems such as silepins and phosphepins, boron has a vacant p-orbital that can interact with the π and π* orbitals of the cycloheptatriene. This leads to an isoelectronic state akin to that of the tropylium cation, aromatizing the borepin while also allowing it to act as a Lewis acid. The aromaticity of borepin is relatively weak compared to traditional aromatics such as benzene or even cycloheptatriene, which has led to the synthesis of many fused, π-conjugated borepin systems over the years. Simple and complex borepins have been extensively studied more recently due to their high fluorescence and potential applications in technologies like organic light-emitting diodes (OLEDs) and photovoltaic cells.

== Synthesis ==
=== First reported synthetic method ===
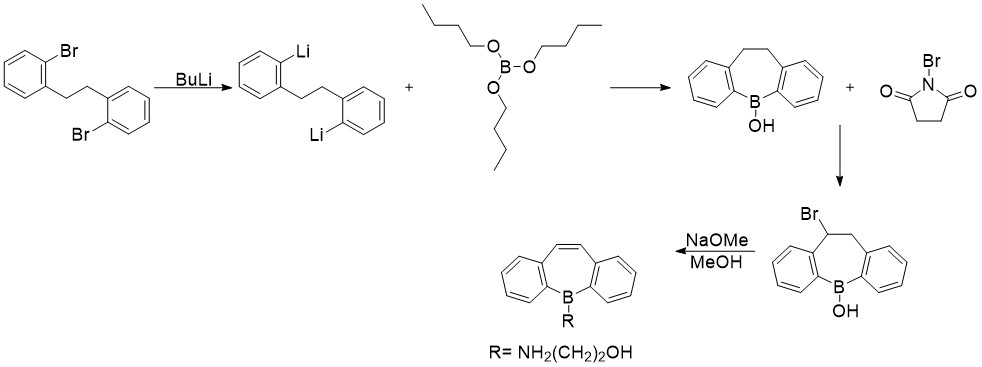
Reaction scheme of o,o'-dibromobibenzyl to make the first reported borepin system.

The first synthesis of a stable borepin was reported in 1960 by van Tamelen, Brieger, and Untch. The synthesis began with a lithiation of o,o'-dibromobibenzyl. Next it was reacted with tributyl borate to yield a fused borinic acid ring. This product was reacted with n-bromosuccinimide (NBS) to yield a bromo-substituted product. Finally, they performed a dehydrohalogenation to yield the borepin ring system seen above. A method similar to this involving a tin-boron exchange is commonly used in modern synthesis of fused borepin systems.

=== Synthetic developments ===
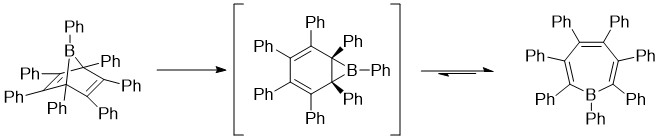
First synthetic procedure for a borepin lacking additional π-conjugation from fused phenyl rings.

Eisch and Galle isolated the first non-fused borepin in 1975. The heptaphenyl borabicycloheptadiene on the left went through a suprafacial sigmatropic rearrangement, leading to the intermediate in the middle. This intermediate subsequently underwent disrotatory ring opening to yield heptaphenylborepin on the right. The isolated borepin is kinetically stabilized by the bulky phenyl groups bound to all seven positions on the ring, protecting it from reactions with moisture in the air. However, like most borepins, this compound reacted with oxygen, turning from fluorescent green to purple.

Synthetic route to minimally substituted borepin.

More recently a method for a minimally substituted borepin was developed by Ashe and Drone. They proceeded from 1,2-dibromocyclopentene and performed a van der Kerk method for boron heterocycle preparation. Next, they initiated a ring closure to form a 7-membered tin complex. Finally, they completed a tin-boron exchange reaction to afford the bicyclic borepin on the right.

Previous synthetic methods yielded heavily substituted and bulky borepin compounds such as heptaphenyl borepin. These routes, while generating very stable complexes, made it difficult to analyze the properties of the borepin ring. Minimal substitution allowed scientists like Ashe to confirm the presence of aromaticity and ring currents within the borepin system.

As more modern methods appeared, the tin-boron exchange reaction has become more commonly used as tin can act as a placeholder in the seven-membered ring, reacting with boryl halides quite easily.

=== Isomerization ===
As a final note, in 2018 the Braunschweig group synthesized a valence isomer of borepin, shown below. This bicyclic, boron-containing heterocycle can be interconverted to its borepin isomer using pericyclic, photochemical reactions.

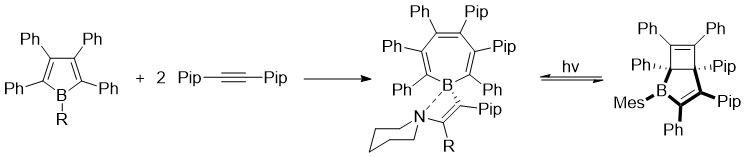
Borepin valence isomer interconversion via photochemical reaction conditions.

== Reactivity ==
While direct functionalization of the boron atom is possible due to its vacant p-orbital, most simple borepins are simply too reactive with air and moisture to be isolated. Therefore, borepins have been stabilized by two general methods: bulky, kinetically stabilizing ligands bound to the boron center and additional aromatic π-systems that can donate electron density into the empty boron p-orbital.

=== Lewis acid-base adducts ===
Borepins are of interest due to their Lewis acidity. Density functional theory (DFT) calculations have shown that the HOMO of borepin lies mostly with the carbon moieties of the seven-membered ring, while the LUMO is centered around the boron atom. An example of the HOMO/LUMO distribution can be seen in the figure below.

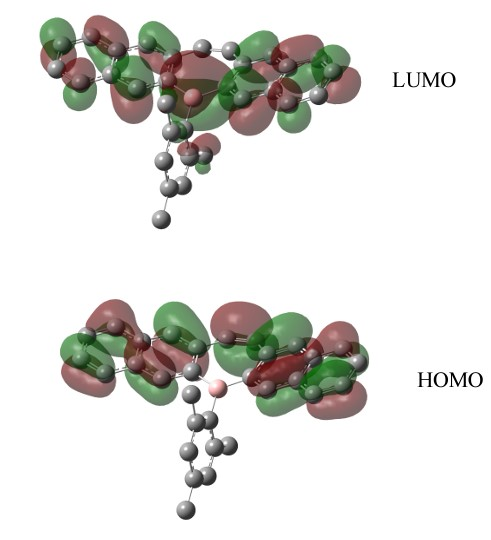
HOMO/LUMO electronic density mapping. Carbon atoms are in grey while the boron atom is pink/red in the center of the image.

Chemists like Ashe were able to utilize this knowledge in the 1990s to functionalize borepins as a compound, leading to the formation of many Lewis acid-base adducts. The most common borepin precursor used by chemists is a borepin-halide complex as halides are a good leaving group. The borepin-hydride complex has not been able to be isolated due to its instability, whereas the boron-doped spirocycle on the right side satisfies boron's octet, forming a zwitterion between boron and nitrogen.

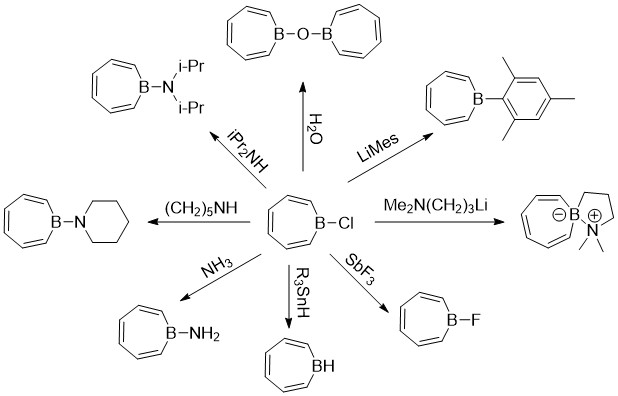
Early examples of Lewis acid-base adducts formed from the functionalization of borepins

=== Borepin cations, anions, and radicals ===
Using the concept of zwitterions, Gilliard et al. was recently able to synthesize and characterize a cationic borepin state using N-heterocyclic carbenes (NHCs) and cyclic(alkyl)(amino)carbenes (CAACS). Due to the dative donation of NHCs and CAACs, boron has only two covalent bonds, giving it a formal positive charge.

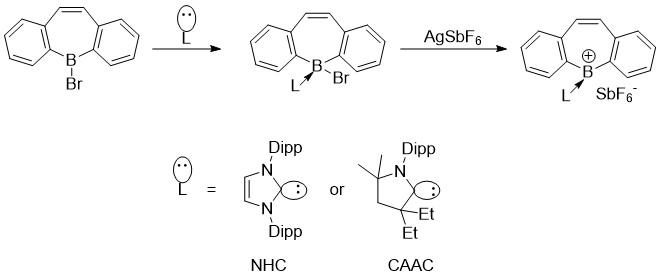
First reported instance of NHC/CAAC stabilized borepinium cations. Antimony hexafluoride (SbF6-) is used as a counterion and does not participate in bonding to the borepin.

Most recently, in 2022 Gilliard et al. were able to apply similar principles from their cationic borepins to form and characterize the first instance of isolated borepin radicals. These radicals were also capable of being reduced to the first instance of a borepin anion where there is multiple bonding between a boron-carbon center. The generation of the radical comes from the strong π-accepting ability of the carbene carbon. The electron density shared with the boron center back bonds slightly with the carbon atom, leading to the single-electron radical species.

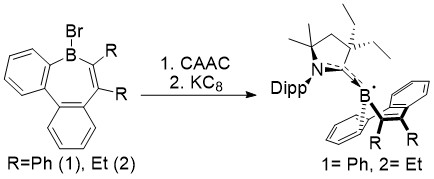
CAAC stabilized borepin radical. Note the boat conformation the borepin ring adopts to coordinate to the CAAC ligand.

=== Framework manipulation ===
Spectroscopic data, DFT calculations, and thermochemical data have shown that borepin is weakly aromatic when compared to the tropylium cation. This reduction in aromaticity leads to increased reactivity and instability at the boron center as there is less electron density being donated to boron's p-orbital.

As a result, chemists sought ways to increase the aromatic character of borepins. The tried-and-true method by which chemists stabilize borepins is phenyl-borepin ring fusion (annulation). The addition of two fused phenyl rings increases the 6π borepin system to a 14π fused system.

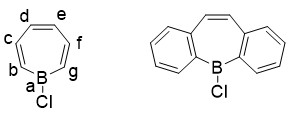
Most common example of phenyl-borepin fusion. Halide ion is present to showcase borepin before reactions with Lewis bases. Generic borepin on the left explains labeling of atoms for clarity.

A complication that arises with fusion of the phenyl rings is their positioning. When synthesizing dibenzo[b,f]borepins (b is the carbon next to the boron atom) they are perfectly aligned for conjugation of the borocycloheptatriene ring. However, if the phenyls are positioned in a [c,e] fashion (see below) then the resulting compound is less stable than dibenzo[b,f]borepins by around 34 kcal/mol, quite a large energy difference.

Example of a dibenzo[c,e]borepin. Note how the phenyls are no longer positioned in conjunction with the borepin π-bonds.

These results explained by Schulman and Disch have been applied many times over to modify borepin frameworks. Some common examples include increasing the number of rings—making boron-doped polycyclic-aromatic hydrocarbons (PAHs), adding additional R groups to the framework such as alkynes and long-chain alkanes, and even introducing electron-rich heteroatoms such as nitrogen or sulfur in order to further stabilize the borepins. Some examples of these compounds can be seen in the image below:

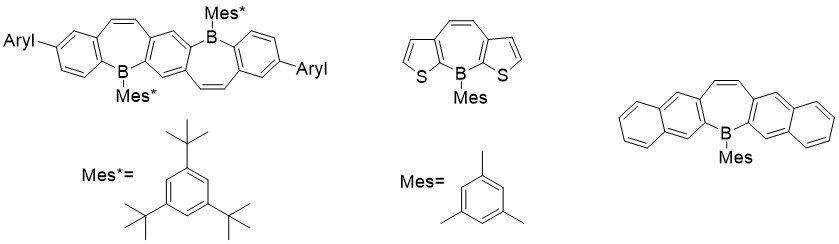
The presence of extremely bulky stabilizing groups on the boron heteroatom keep borepins, especially the fused diborepin, from rapidly decomposing.

The rapid development of borepin stabilization and functionalization since the 2000s has catapulted studies of complex and versatile molecules. Like many other main group compounds, borepins have been in the field since the mid-late 1900s yet lay dormant until more modern methods could utilize them.

== Photophysical properties ==
=== Fluorescence/phosphorescence ===
The first reports of fluorescence in a borepin was published in 1975 by Eisch and Galle and described how heptaphenylborepin was fluorescent green when probed. Little photophysical phenomena were recorded for many years, until Piers's group published the first example of a blue-fluorescent borepin species in 2009. They discovered that by expanding the π-system (i.e. adding more fused phenyl rings) they could dramatically shift the wavelength of their compounds from around 250 nanometers (nm) to upwards of 450 nm. The rationale behind this shift is that the presence of boron in the aromatic system decreases the energy gap between the HOMO and LUMO, resulting in changing absorptions and greater intensity of fluorescence. Similar results were reported by Caruso, Tovar, and Siegler in 2010 when they ran borepins through electrochemical redox reactions and by Messersmith, Siegler, and Tovar in 2016 when testing the effects of variable aromaticity of borepins.

The initial excitement behind these results was the potential for use in electronic materials such as organic light-emitting diodes (OLEDs). If the fluorescence "switch" could be controlled, in addition to having stable borepin complexes, then it would be relatively easy and cheap to achieve bright fluorescent lights, potentially of any color.

Another potential of redox chemistry is the use of boron-containing polycyclic aromatic hydrocarbons as semiconductors. Because of borepins' low-lying LUMO, it can act as an electron acceptor to participate in electron transport. The Wagner group as well as Toscano and co-workers showed computationally and experimentally the potential applications for these complexes.

On another note, scientists have sought to utilize borepins as potential anion sensors. In the past, tri-coordinate boranes have been used to detect anions like fluoride, cyanide, and even ammonia. Scientists like Adachi and Ohshita have demonstrated that upon coordination of fluoride (F^{−}) fluorescence increases by many magnitudes.

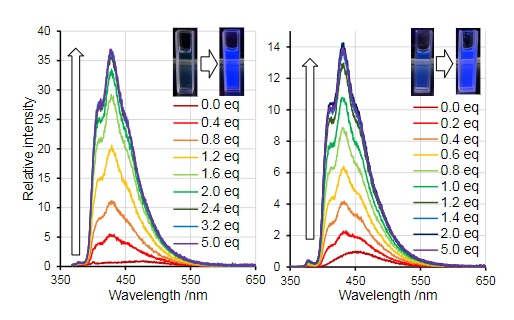
Figure shows fluorescence output of anthracene-substituted tetracyclic borepins upon titration with increasing equivalents of tetrabutylammoniumfluoride (TBAF). Increase of intensity correlates positively between compounds as TBAF is added.

In contrast to that example, upon addition of cyanide to one of their borepin analogues to tetrathienoanthracence, Adachi and Ohshita saw a loss of fluorescence. However, upon cooling, there was a noticeable phosphorescence in solution.

Fluorescence is not only limited to outside coordination. Upon insertion of nitrogen into the borepin ring, Li et al. were able to observe solvatochromic effects. Upon addition of the borepin to hexanes, toluene, tetrahydrofuran (THF), dichloromethane (DCM) and acetonitrile (MeCN), rather drastic changes in color were observed.

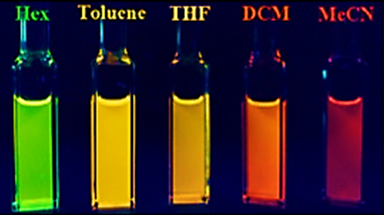
Solvatochromic property of N-doped diazoborepins.
