= 1,3-Diphenyltriazene =

Names
- Preferred IUPAC name 1,3-Diphenyltriaz-1-ene
- Other names Diazoaminobenzene

Identifiers
CAS Number	136-35-6
3D model (JSmol)	Interactive image
ChEMBL	ChEMBL573540
ChemSpider	8365
ECHA InfoCard	100.004.764
EC Number	205-240-1
PubChem CID	8689
UNII	5T4EEW75HJ
CompTox Dashboard (EPA)	DTXSID9024934
- InChI: InChI=1S/C12H11N3/c1-3-7-11(8-4-1)13-15-14-12-9-5-2-6-10-12/h1-10H,(H,13,14) Key: ALIFPGGMJDWMJH-UHFFFAOYSA-N
- SMILES: C1=CC=C(C=C1)NN=NC2=CC=CC=C2

Properties
Chemical formula	C_{12}H_{11}N_{3}
Molar mass	197.241 g·mol^{−1}
Appearance	Pale yellow solid
Density	1.29 g/cm^{3}
Melting point	95–96 °C (203–205 °F; 368–369 K)
Boiling point	180 °C (356 °F; 453 K) decomposes

Hazards
- GHS labelling
Pictograms	(GHS07: Exclamation mark)
Signal word	Warning
Hazard statements	H302, H312, H315, H319, H332, H335
Precautionary statements	P261, P264, P270, P271, P280, P301+P312, P302+P352, P304+P312, P304+P340, P305+P351+P338, P312, P321, P322, P330, P332+P313, P337+P313, P362, P363, P403+P233, P405, P501
- Except where otherwise noted, data are given for materials in their standard state (at 25 °C [77 °F], 100 kPa). Infobox references

1,3-Diphenyltriazene is the organic compound with the formula PhN=N-N(H)Ph (Ph = C_{6}H_{5}). It is a prototypical triazene, i.e. a compound with the functional group RN=N-NR_{2}. It is a pale yellow solid, prepared by the reaction of phenyldiazonium chloride with aniline. It can be prepared from aniline in a one-pot reaction via partial diazotization. It is a planar molecule. The N-N distances are 1.287 and 1.337 Å.
