= Gomberg–Bachmann reaction =

Aryl-aryl coupling reaction via a diazonium salt

Named after	Moses Gomberg; Werner Emmanuel Bachmann
Reaction type	Coupling reaction

The Gomberg–Bachmann reaction, named for the Russian-American chemist Moses Gomberg and the American chemist Werner Emmanuel Bachmann, is an aryl-aryl coupling reaction via a diazonium salt.

The arene compound (here benzene) is reacted with a diazonium salt in the presence of a base to provide the biaryl through an intermediate aryl radical. For example, p-bromobiphenyl may be prepared from 4-bromoaniline and benzene:

BrC_{6}H_{4}NH_{2} + C_{6}H_{6} → BrC_{6}H_{4}−C_{6}H_{5}

The reaction offers a wide scope for both diazonium component and arene component but yields are generally low following the original procedure (less than 40%), given the many side-reactions of diazonium salts. Several improvements have been suggested. One possibility is to employ diazonium tetrafluoroborates in arene solvent together with a phase-transfer catalyst, another is to use 1-aryl-3,3-dialkyltriazenes.

== Pschorr reaction ==
One intramolecular variation which gives better results is the Pschorr cyclization:

The group Z can be CH_{2}, CH_{2}CH_{2}, NH and CO (to fluorenone) to name just a few.

== See also ==
- Graebe–Ullmann synthesis
- Meerwein arylation
- Sandmeyer reaction
