= 3-Fluorobenzoic acid =

Names
- Preferred IUPAC name 3-Fluorobenzoic acid
- Other names m-Fluorobenzoic acid

Identifiers
| CAS Number | 455-38-9 |
| 3D model (JSmol) | Interactive image |
| ChEBI | CHEBI:20021 |
| ChEMBL | ChEMBL302365 |
| ChemSpider | 9574 |
| ECHA InfoCard | 100.006.590 |
| KEGG | C02364 |
| PubChem CID | 9968 |
| UNII | ELG54JFF34 |
| CompTox Dashboard (EPA) | DTXSID4060020 |
- InChI: InChI=1S/C7H5FO2/c8-6-3-1-2-5(4-6)7(9)10/h1-4H,(H,9,10) Key: MXNBDFWNYRNIBH-UHFFFAOYSA-N
- SMILES: C1=CC(=CC(=C1)F)C(=O)O

Properties
| Chemical formula | C_{7}H_{5}FO_{2} |
| Molar mass | 140.113 g·mol^{−1} |
| Appearance | White powder |
| Melting point | 123 °C (253 °F; 396 K) |
| Solubility in water | Very soluble |
| log P | 2.163 |
| Acidity (pK_{a}) | 3.86 |

Hazards
| Flash point | 106 °C (223 °F; 379 K) |
| Safety data sheet (SDS) | Laboratory Chemical Safety Summary |

Hazards
- GHS labelling
| Pictograms | (GHS07: Exclamation mark) |
| Signal word | Warning |
| Hazard statements | H315, H319, H335 |
| Precautionary statements | P261, P264, P271, P280, P302+P352, P304+P340, P305+P351+P338, P321, P403+P233, P405, P501 |
| NFPA 704 (fire diamond) | 2 0 0 |
- Except where otherwise noted, data are given for materials in their standard state (at 25 °C [77 °F], 100 kPa). Infobox references

3-Fluorobenzoic acid is an organic compound with the formula C_{7}H_{5}FO_{2}. It is the meta form of fluorobenzoic acid. Its conjugate base is 3-fluorobenzoate. The compound is an irritant. Its acidity (pKa) is lower than that of the ortho form (2-fluorobenzoic acid) but higher than that of the para form (4-fluorobenzoic acid). It has been used in a variety of scientific applications.
