= Fluoroboric acid =

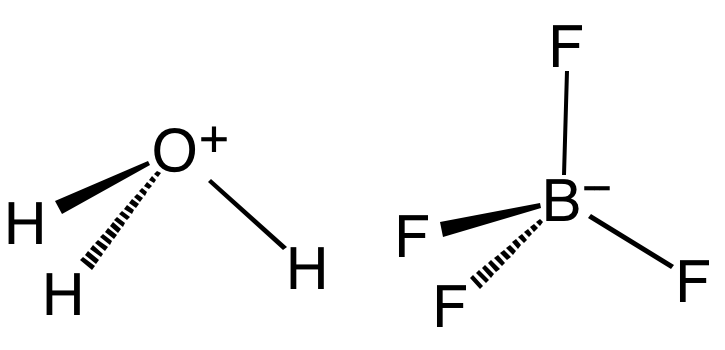
- Canonical, skeletal formula of oxonium tetrafluoroborate Hydronium tetrafluoroborate

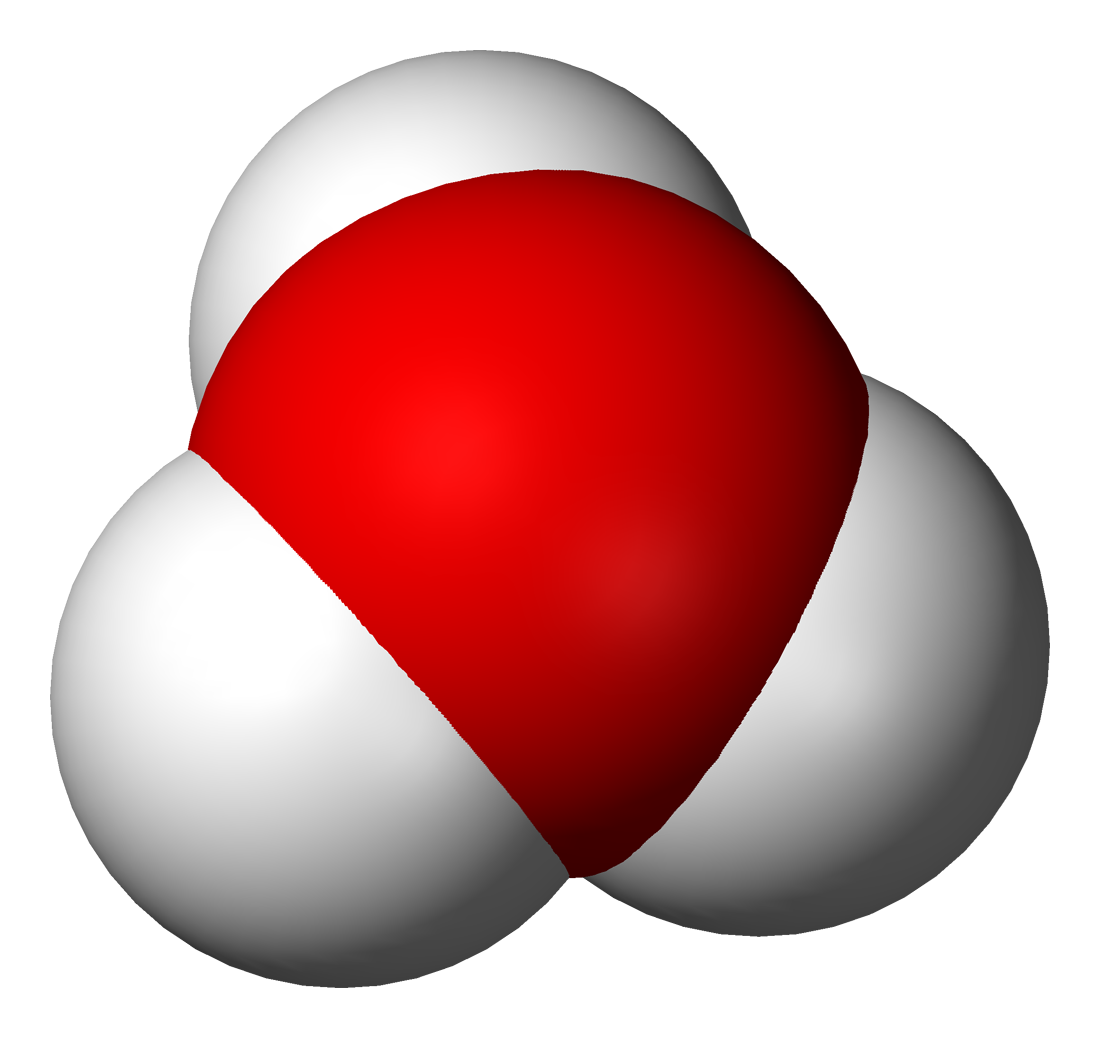
Hydronium cation
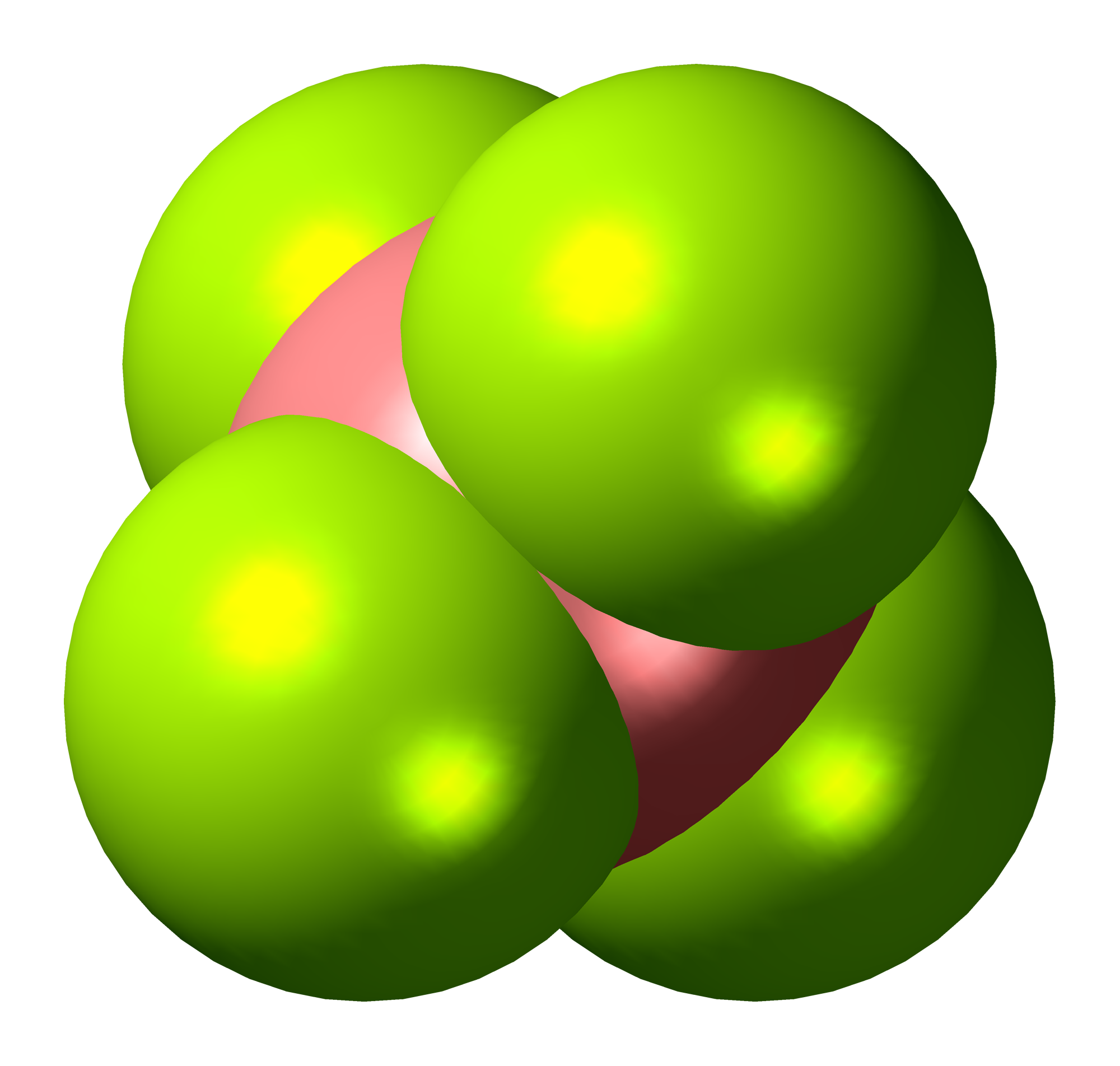
Tetrafluoroborate anion

Names
- Preferred IUPAC name Tetrafluoroboric acid
- Other names: Hydrogen tetrafluoroborate; Oxonium tetrafluoroboranuide; Oxonium tetrafluoridoborate(1-); Oxonium tetrafluoroborate

Identifiers
CAS Number	14219-41-1 ([H_{3}O]^{+}[BF_{4}]^{−}); 16872-11-0 (solvent free); 80628-99-5 ([H_{5}O_{2}]^{+}[BF_{4}]^{−})
3D model (JSmol)	Interactive image; Interactive image
ChEBI	CHEBI:38902
ChemSpider	26156
ECHA InfoCard	100.037.165
EC Number	240-898-3
Gmelin Reference	21702
MeSH	Fluoroboric+acid
PubChem CID	28118
RTECS number	ED2685000
UNII	H429WZ9FBQ
UN number	1775
CompTox Dashboard (EPA)	DTXSID8029739
- InChI: InChI=1S/BF4H/c2-1(3,4)5/h2H Key: YKRRMQXMWYXWJW-UHFFFAOYSA-N
- SMILES: F[B-](F)(F)[FH+]; [H+].F[B-](F)(F)F

Properties
Chemical formula	H[BF_{4}]
Molar mass	87.81 g·mol^{−1}
Appearance	Colourless liquid
Density	1.4 g/mL (48% solution in water)
Melting point	−90 °C (−130 °F; 183 K)
Boiling point	130 °C (266 °F; 403 K)
Vapor pressure	5 mmHg (0.67 kPa) (20 °C (68 °F; 293 K))
Acidity (pK_{a})	~1.8 (MeCN solution)

Hazards
- GHS labelling
Pictograms	(GHS05: Corrosive)
Signal word	Danger
Hazard statements	H314
Precautionary statements	P264, P280, P301+P330+P331, P303+P361+P353, P304+P340+P310, P305+P351+P338+P310, P405, P501
NFPA 704 (fire diamond)	3 1 0
Threshold limit value (TLV)	2.5 mg/m^{3} (TWA), 6 mg/m^{3} (STEL)
- NIOSH (US health exposure limits)
PEL (Permissible)	2.5 mg/m^{3} (TWA)
IDLH (Immediate danger)	250 mg/m^{3}

Related compounds
Related compounds	Hydrogen fluoride; Triflic acid; Hexafluorophosphoric acid
- Except where otherwise noted, data are given for materials in their standard state (at 25 °C [77 °F], 100 kPa). verify (what is ?) Infobox references

Fluoroboric acid or tetrafluoroboric acid (archaically, fluoboric acid) is an inorganic compound with the simplified chemical formula H^{+}[BF_{4}]^{−}. Solvent-free tetrafluoroboric acid (H[BF_{4}]) has not been reported. The term "fluoroboric acid" usually refers to a range of compounds including hydronium tetrafluoroborate ([H_{3}O]^{+}[BF_{4}]^{−}), which are available as solutions. The ethyl ether solvate is also commercially available, where the fluoroboric acid can be represented by the formula [H((CH_{3}CH_{2})_{2}O)_{n}]^{+}[BF_{4}]^{−}, where n is 2.

It is mainly produced as a precursor to other fluoroborate salts. It is a strong acid. Fluoroboric acid is corrosive and attacks the skin. It is available commercially as a solution in water and other solvents such as diethyl ether. It is a strong acid with a weakly coordinating, non-oxidizing conjugate base. It is structurally similar to perchloric acid, but lacks the hazards associated with oxidants.

== Structure and production ==
Pure H[BF_{4}] has not been described. The same holds true for the superacids that are known by the simplified formulas H[PF_{6}] and H[SbF_{6}]. However, a solution of BF_{3} in HF is highly acidic, having an approximate speciation of [H_{2}F]^{+}[BF_{4}]^{−} (fluoronium tetrafluoroborate) and a Hammett acidity function of −16.6 at 7 mol % BF_{3}, easily qualifying as a superacid. Although the solvent-free H[BF_{4}] has not been isolated, its solvates are well characterized. These salts consist of protonated solvent as a cation, e.g., H_{3}O^{+} and H_{5}O^{+}_{2}, and the tetrahedral BF^{−}_{4} anion. The anion and cations are strongly hydrogen-bonded.

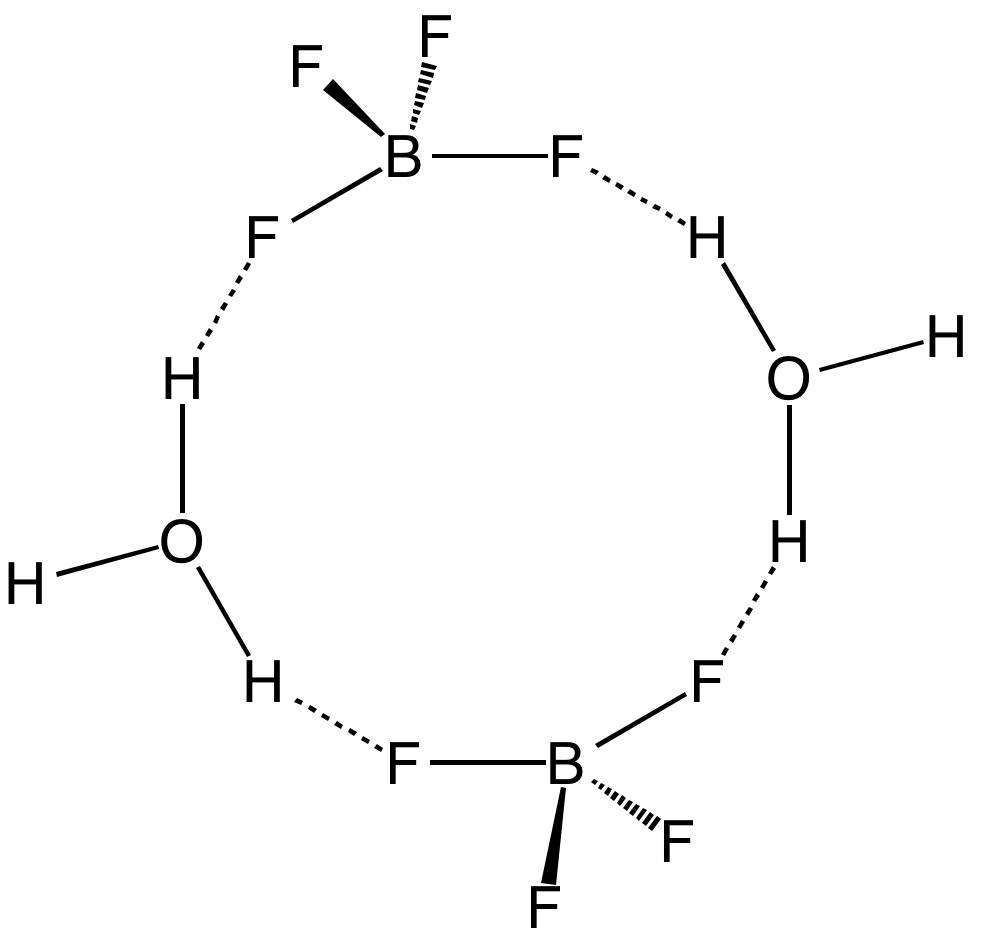
Subunit of crystal structure of [H_{3}O]^{+}[BF_{4}]^{−} highlighting the hydrogen bonding between the cation and the anion

Aqueous solutions of H[BF_{4}] are produced by dissolving boric acid in aqueous hydrofluoric acid. Three equivalents of HF react to give the intermediate boron trifluoride and the fourth gives fluoroboric acid:

B(OH)_{3} + 4 HF → H_{3}O^{+} + BF^{−}_{4} + 2 H_{2}O

An anhydrous fluoroboric acid solution can be prepared by adding aqueous fluoroboric acid to an excess of acetic anhydride at 0 °C (32 °F), which produces a solution of fluoroboric acid, acetic acid, and residual acetic anhydride.

=== Acidity ===
Determination of the acidity of fluoroboric acid is complicated by the fact that its name refers to a range of different compounds, e.g. [H(CH_{3}CH_{2})_{2}O]^{+}[BF_{4}]^{−} (dimethyloxonium tetrafluoroborate), [H_{3}O]^{+}[BF_{4}]^{−} (oxonium tetrafluoroborate), and HF·BF_{3} (hydrogen fluoride-boron trifluoride 1:1 adduct) – each with a different acidity. The aqueous pK_{a} is quoted as −0.44. Titration of [N((CH_{2})_{3}CH_{3})_{4}]^{+}[BF_{4}]^{−} (tetrabutylammonium tetrafluoroborate) in acetonitrile solution indicates that H[BF_{4}], i.e., HF·BF_{3}, has a pK_{a} of 1.6 in that solvent. Its acidity is thus comparable to that of fluorosulfonic acid.

== Applications ==
Fluoroboric acid is the principal precursor to fluoroborate salts, which are typically prepared by treating the metal oxides with fluoroboric acid. The inorganic salts are intermediates in the manufacture of flame-retardant materials and glazing frits, and in electrolytic generation of boron. H[BF_{4}] is also used in aluminum etching and acid pickling.

=== Organic chemistry ===
H[BF_{4}] is used as a catalyst for alkylations and polymerizations. In carbohydrate protection reactions, ethereal fluoroboric acid is an efficient and cost-effective catalyst for transacetalation and isopropylidenation reactions. Many reactive cations have also been obtained using fluoroboric acid (i.e. tropylium tetrafluoroborate (C_{7}H_{7}^{+}[BF_{4}]^{−}).

=== Electroplating ===
Solutions of H[BF_{4}] are used in the electroplating of tin and tin alloys. In this application, methanesulfonic acid is displacing the use of H[BF_{4}]. Fluoroboric acid is also used for high-speed electroplating of copper in fluoroborate baths.

== Safety ==
Fluoroboric acid is toxic and attacks skin and eyes. It attacks glass. It hydrolyzes, releasing corrosive, volatile hydrogen fluoride.

== Other fluoroboric acids ==
A series of fluoroboric acids is known in aqueous solutions. The series can be presented as follows:

- H^{+}[B(OH)_{4}]^{−} (hydrogen tetrahydroxyborate) (not a fluoroboric acid)
- H^{+}[BF(OH)_{3}]^{−} (hydrogen fluoro(trihydroxy)borate)
- H^{+}[BF_{2}(OH)_{2}]^{−} (hydrogen difluoro(dihydroxy)borate)
- H^{+}[BF_{3}(OH)]^{−} (hydrogen trifluoro(hydroxy)borate)
- H^{+}[BF_{4}]^{−} (hydrogen tetrafluoroborate)

== See also ==
- Fluorosulfuric acid
- Fluoroantimonic acid
