= 2-Fluorobenzoic acid =

Names
- Preferred IUPAC name 2-Fluorobenzoic acid
- Other names o-Fluorobenzoic acid

Identifiers
CAS Number	445-29-4
3D model (JSmol)	Interactive image
ChEBI	CHEBI:19577
ChEMBL	ChEMBL114383
ChemSpider	9547
ECHA InfoCard	100.006.509
KEGG	C02359
PubChem CID	9935
UNII	64UZ32KOO4
CompTox Dashboard (EPA)	DTXSID1060001
- InChI: InChI=1S/C7H5FO2/c8-6-4-2-1-3-5(6)7(9)10/h1-4H,(H,9,10) Key: NSTREUWFTAOOKS-UHFFFAOYSA-N
- SMILES: O=C(O)c1ccccc1F

Properties
Chemical formula	C_{7}H_{5}FO_{2}
Molar mass	140.113 g·mol^{−1}
Melting point	126 °C (259 °F; 399 K)
log P	1.856
Acidity (pK_{a})	3.27

Hazards
Flash point	102 °C (216 °F; 375 K)
Safety data sheet (SDS)	Laboratory Chemical Safety Summary
- Except where otherwise noted, data are given for materials in their standard state (at 25 °C [77 °F], 100 kPa). Infobox references

2-Fluorobenzoic acid is an aromatic organic compound with the formula FC_{6}H_{4}CO_{2}H. It is one of three isomeric fluorobenzoic acids. Its conjugate base is 2-fluorobenzoate. The compound is an irritant.

Its metabolism has been studied extensively in the field of microbiology. Its conjugate base is part of the pathway of 2-fluorobiphenyl metabolism by Pseudomonas pseudoalcaligenes.

== See also ==
- 4-Fluorobenzoic acid, the para isomer
- 3-Fluorobenzoic acid, the meta isomer
- 2-Chlorobenzoic acid
