= Bis(pyridine)iodonium(I) tetrafluoroborate =

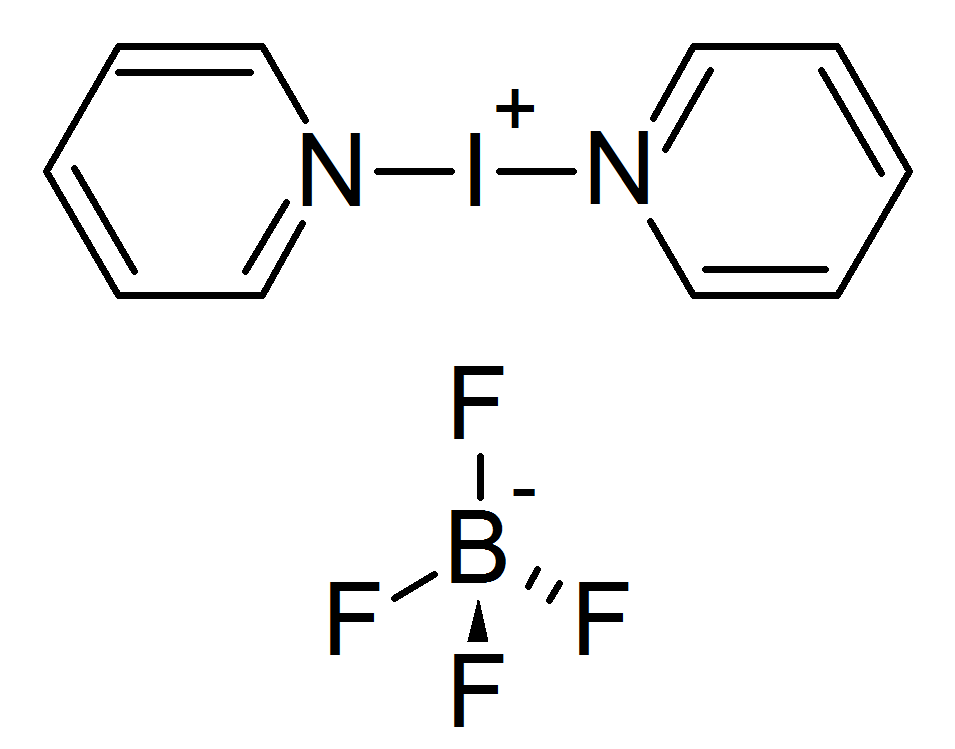

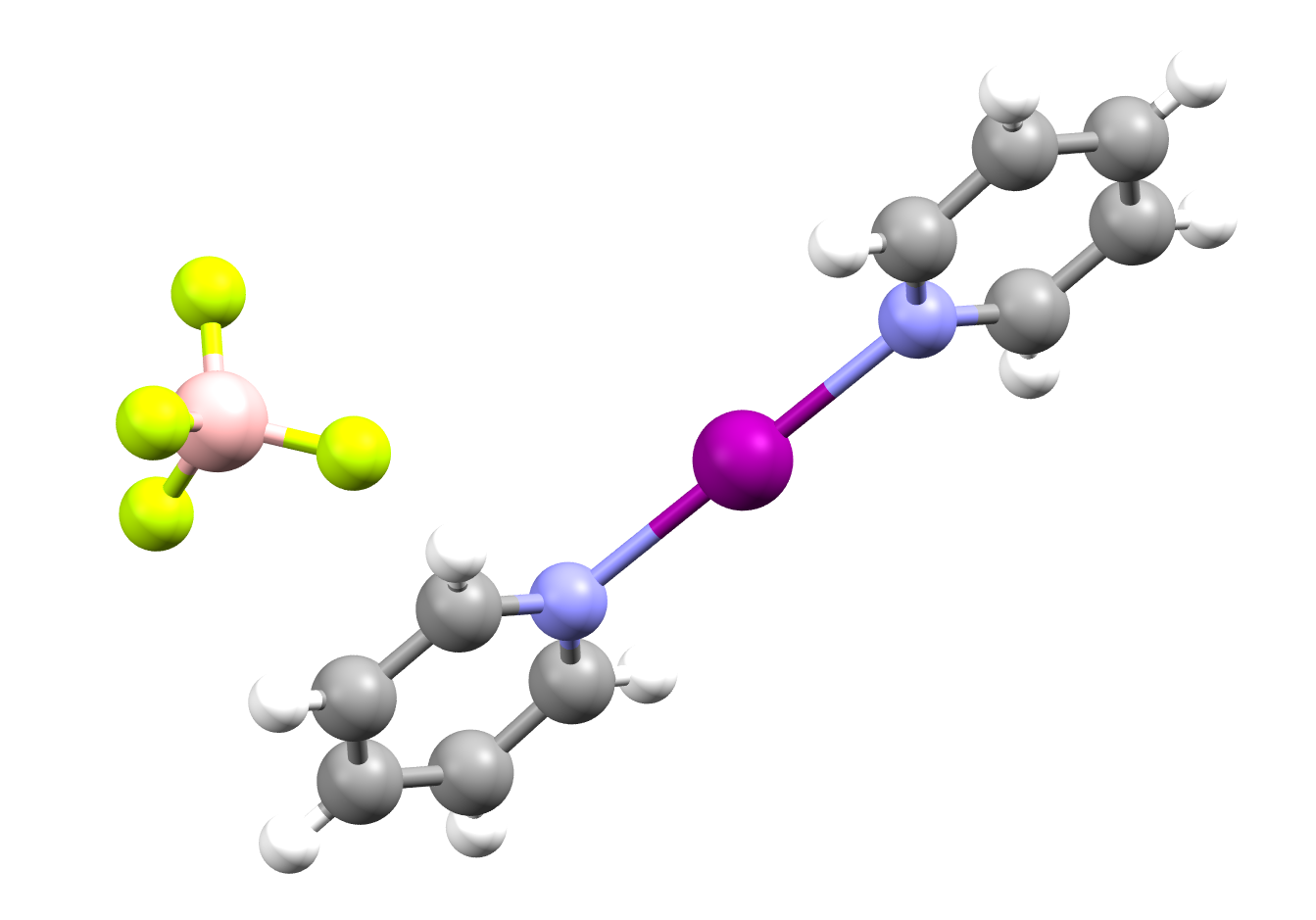

Names
- IUPAC name bis(pyridin-1-ium-1-yl)iodanuide tetrafluoroborate
- Other names Barluenga's Reagent

Identifiers
CAS Number	15656-28-7
3D model (JSmol)	Interactive image
ChemSpider	2016454
ECHA InfoCard	100.156.678
PubChem CID	10883201 erroneous content
UNII	96046808SX
CompTox Dashboard (EPA)	DTXSID50447027
- InChI: InChI=1S/C10H10IN2.BF4/c1-3-7-12(8-4-1)11-13-9-5-2-6-10-13;2-1(3,4)5/h1-10H;/q+1;-1 Key: BMDSRCBKJZCUBH-UHFFFAOYSA-N
- SMILES: [B-](F)(F)(F)F.C1=CC=CC=N1[I+]N2C=CC=CC=2

Properties
Chemical formula	C_{10}H_{10}BF_{4}IN_{2}
Molar mass	371.91 g·mol^{−1}

Hazards
- GHS labelling
Pictograms	(GHS07: Exclamation mark)
Signal word	Warning
Hazard statements	H315, H319, H335
Precautionary statements	P261, P264, P271, P280, P302+P352, P304+P340, P305+P351+P338, P312, P321, P332+P313, P337+P313, P362, P403+P233, P405, P501
- Except where otherwise noted, data are given for materials in their standard state (at 25 °C [77 °F], 100 kPa). verify (what is ?) Infobox references

Bis(pyridine)iodonium(I) tetrafluoroborate or Barluenga's reagent, named after José Barluenga, is a mild iodinating reagent. Commercially available, it may be prepared by reacting iodine with pyridine in the presence of silver tetrafluoroborate supported on silica gel.
