= Tropylium cation =

Ion

Tropylium
- skeletal formula

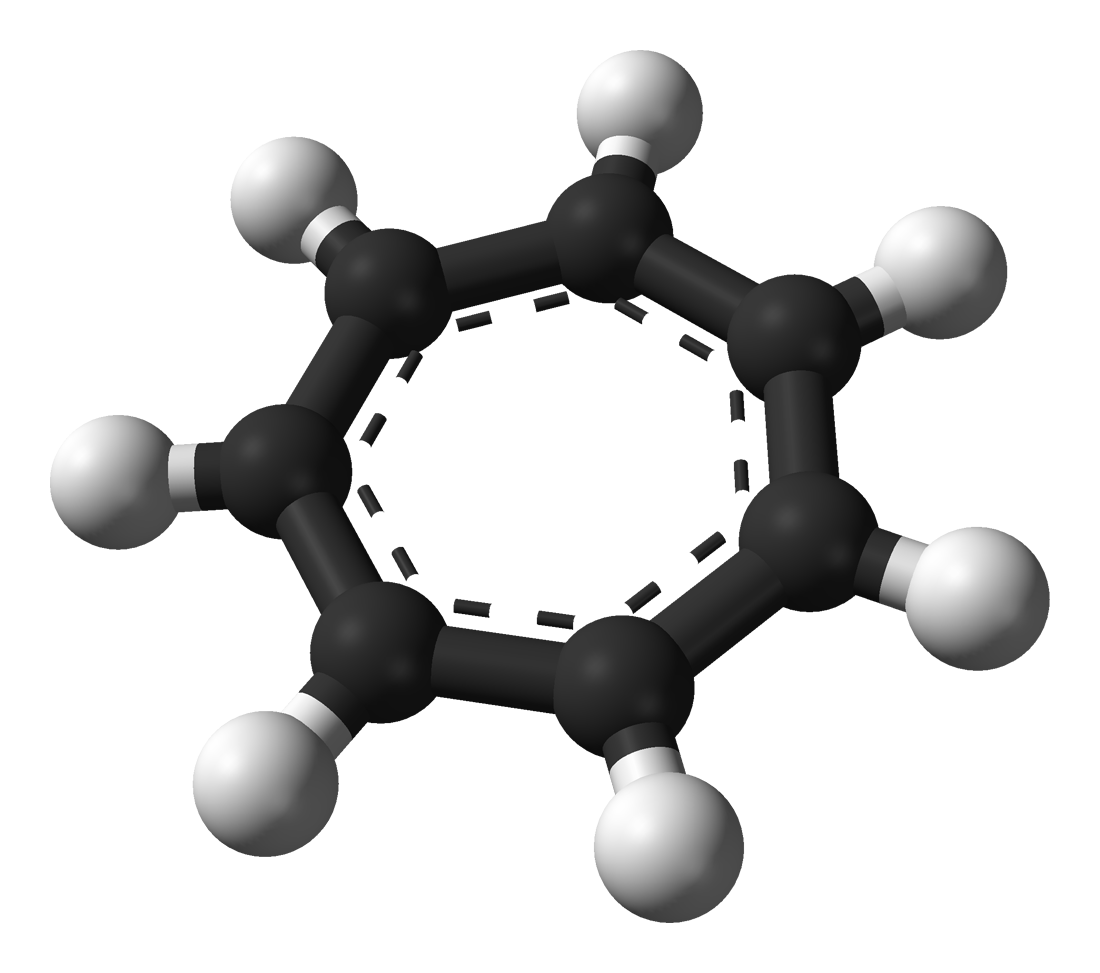
ball-and-stick model
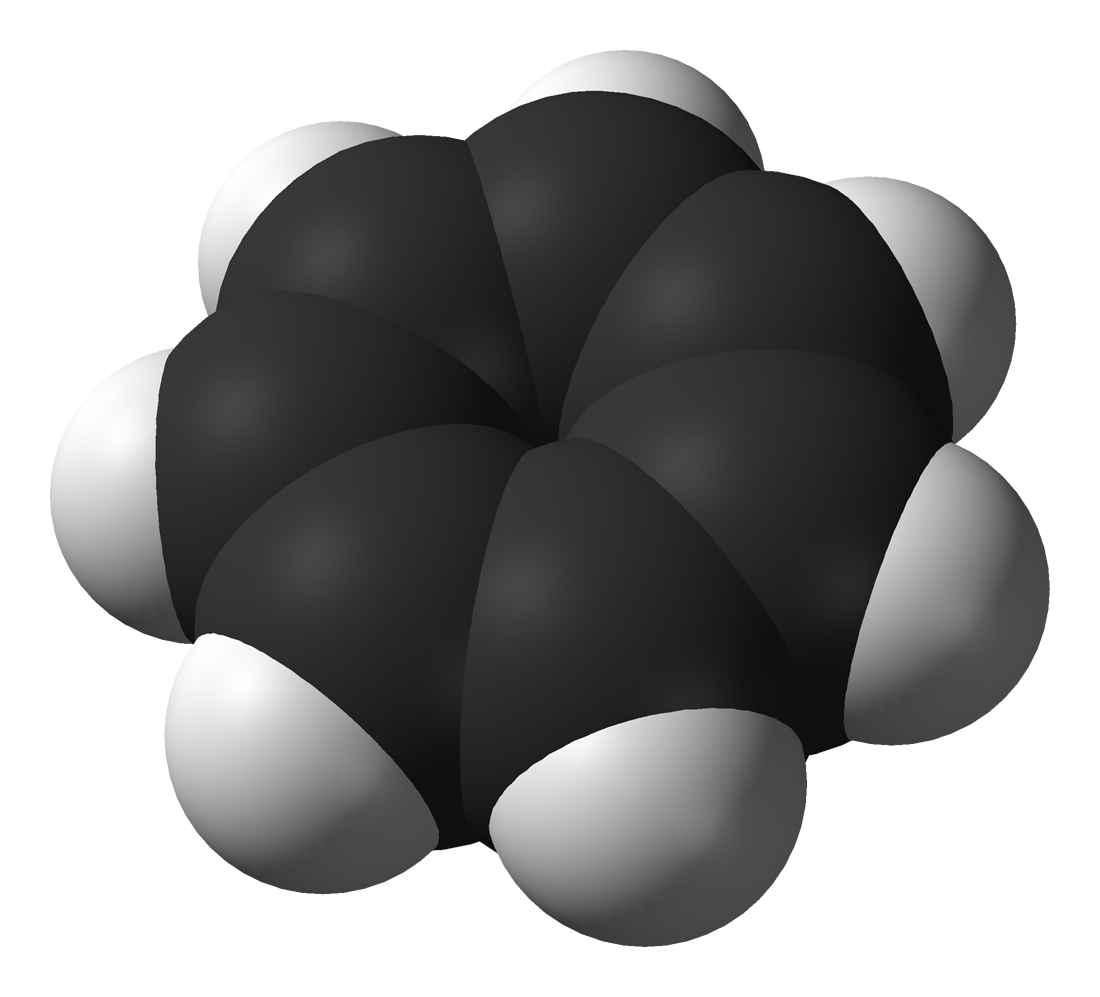
space-filling model

Names
- Preferred IUPAC name Cycloheptatrienylium
- Other names cyc-C_{7}H^{+}_{7}, Cyclohepta-2,4,6-trienylium, Cyclohepta-1,3,5-triene, 2,4,6-Cycloheptatrienylium

Identifiers
| CAS Number | 4118-59-6 |
| 3D model (JSmol) | Interactive image |
| Beilstein Reference | 1902352 |
| ChemSpider | 4394444 |
| PubChem CID | 5224206 |
| CompTox Dashboard (EPA) | DTXSID10411305 |
- InChI: InChI=1S/C7H7/c1-2-4-6-7-5-3-1/h1-7H/q+1 Key: OJOSABWCUVCSTQ-UHFFFAOYSA-N; : InChI=1S/C7H7/c1-2-4-6-7-5-3-1/h1-7H/q+1 Key: OJOSABWCUVCSTQ-UHFFFAOYSA-N
- SMILES: c1=cc=c[cH+]c=c1

Properties
| Chemical formula | C_{7}H^{+}_{7} |
| Molar mass | 91.132 g·mol^{−1} |

Structure
| Point group | D_{7h} |
| Molecular shape | regular heptagon |

Related compounds
| Other anions | Tropylium tetrafluoroborate |
- Except where otherwise noted, data are given for materials in their standard state (at 25 °C [77 °F], 100 kPa). Infobox references

The tropylium ion or cycloheptatrienyl cation is an aromatic species with a formula of [C_{7}H_{7}]^{+}. Its name derives from the molecule tropine from which cycloheptatriene (tropylidene) was first synthesized in 1881. Salts of the tropylium cation can be stable, even with nucleophiles of moderate strength e.g., tropylium tetrafluoroborate and tropylium bromide (see below). Its bromide and chloride salts can be made from cycloheptatriene and bromine or phosphorus pentachloride, respectively.

It is a regular heptagonal, planar, cyclic ion. It has 6 π-electrons (4n + 2, where n = 1), which fulfills Hückel's rule of aromaticity. It can coordinate as a ligand to metal atoms. The structure shown is a composite of seven resonance contributors in which each carbon atom carries part of the positive charge.

== History ==
In 1891 G. Merling obtained a water-soluble bromine-containing compound from the reaction of cycloheptatriene and bromine. Unlike most alkyl bromides, this compound, later named tropylium bromide, is water-soluble but insoluble in many organic solvents. It is purified by crystallization from hot ethanol. Reaction with aqueous silver nitrate immediately gave silver bromide, indicating labile bromide. Tropylium bromide was deduced to be a salt, C_{7}H^{+}_{7}Br^{−}, by Doering and Knox in 1954 by analysis of its infrared and ultraviolet spectra. The ionic structures of tropylium perchlorate (C_{7}H^{+}_{7}ClO^{−}_{4}) and tropylium iodide (C_{7}H^{+}_{7}I^{−}) have been confirmed by X-ray crystallography. The bond length of the carbon-carbon bonds is longer (147 pm) than those of benzene (140 pm) but still shorter than those of a typical single-bonded species like ethane (154 pm).

== Acidity ==
The tropylium ion is an acid in aqueous solution (i.e., an Arrhenius acid) as a consequence of its Lewis acidity: it first acts as a Lewis acid to form an adduct with water, which can then donate a proton to another molecule of water, therefore indirectly acting as an Arrhenius acid:

C_{7}H^{+}_{7} + 2 H_{2}O ⇌ C_{7}H_{7}OH + H_{3}O^{+}

(Boric acid gives acidic aqueous solutions in much the same way.) The equilibrium constant is 1.8×10^{−5}, making it about as acidic in water as acetic acid.

== Mass spectrometry ==
The tropylium ion is frequently encountered in mass spectrometry in the form of a signal at m/z = 91 and is used in mass spectrum analysis. This fragment is often found for aromatic compounds containing a benzyl unit. Upon ionization, the benzyl fragment forms a cation (PhCH^{+}_{2}), which rearranges to the highly stable tropylium cation (C_{7}H^{+}_{7}).

== Reactions ==
The tropylium cation reacts with nucleophiles to form substituted cycloheptatrienes, for example:

C_{7}H^{+}_{7} + CN^{−} → C_{7}H_{7}CN

Reduction by lithium aluminium hydride yields cycloheptatriene.

Reaction with a cyclopentadienide salt of sodium or lithium yields 7-cyclopentadienylcyclohepta-1,3,5-triene:

C_{7}H^{+}_{7}X^{−} + C_{5}H^{−}_{5}Na^{+} → C_{7}H_{7}C_{5}H_{5} + NaX

When treated with oxidising agents such as chromic acid, the tropylium cation undergoes rearrangement into benzaldehyde:

C_{7}H^{+}_{7} + HCrO^{−}_{4} → C_{6}H_{5}CHO + CrO_{2} + H_{2}O

Many metal complexes of tropylium ion are known. One example is [Mo(η^{7}-C_{7}H_{7})(CO)_{3}]^{+}, which is prepared by hydride abstraction from cycloheptatrienemolybdenum tricarbonyl.

== See also ==
- Azulene
- Borepin
