= Meta (chemistry) =

Systematic naming prefix in chemistry

Positions on an aromatic ring relative to the R group

In chemistry, meta is a prefix, used for systematic names in IUPAC nomenclature. It has several meanings.

- In organic chemistry, meta indicates the positions of substituents in aromatic cyclic compounds. The substituents have the 1,3-positions, for example in resorcinol.
- Meta may also denote the dehydrated form of an acid, salt or organic derivative in a series. For example:
  - metabisulfite:
  2 bisulfite (HSO^{−}_{3}) → 1 metabisulfite (S_{2}O^{2−}_{5}) + H_{2}O
  - metaphosphoric acid:
  3 orthophosphoric acid (H_{3}PO_{4}) → 1 trimetaphosphoric acid (H_{3}P_{3}O_{9}) + 3 H_{2}O
  - Meta-antimonic acid, the dehydrated form of antimonic acid (H_{3}SbO_{4}), is HSbO_{3}.

== See also ==
- Arene substitution patterns
