= Tetrafluoroborate =

Anion

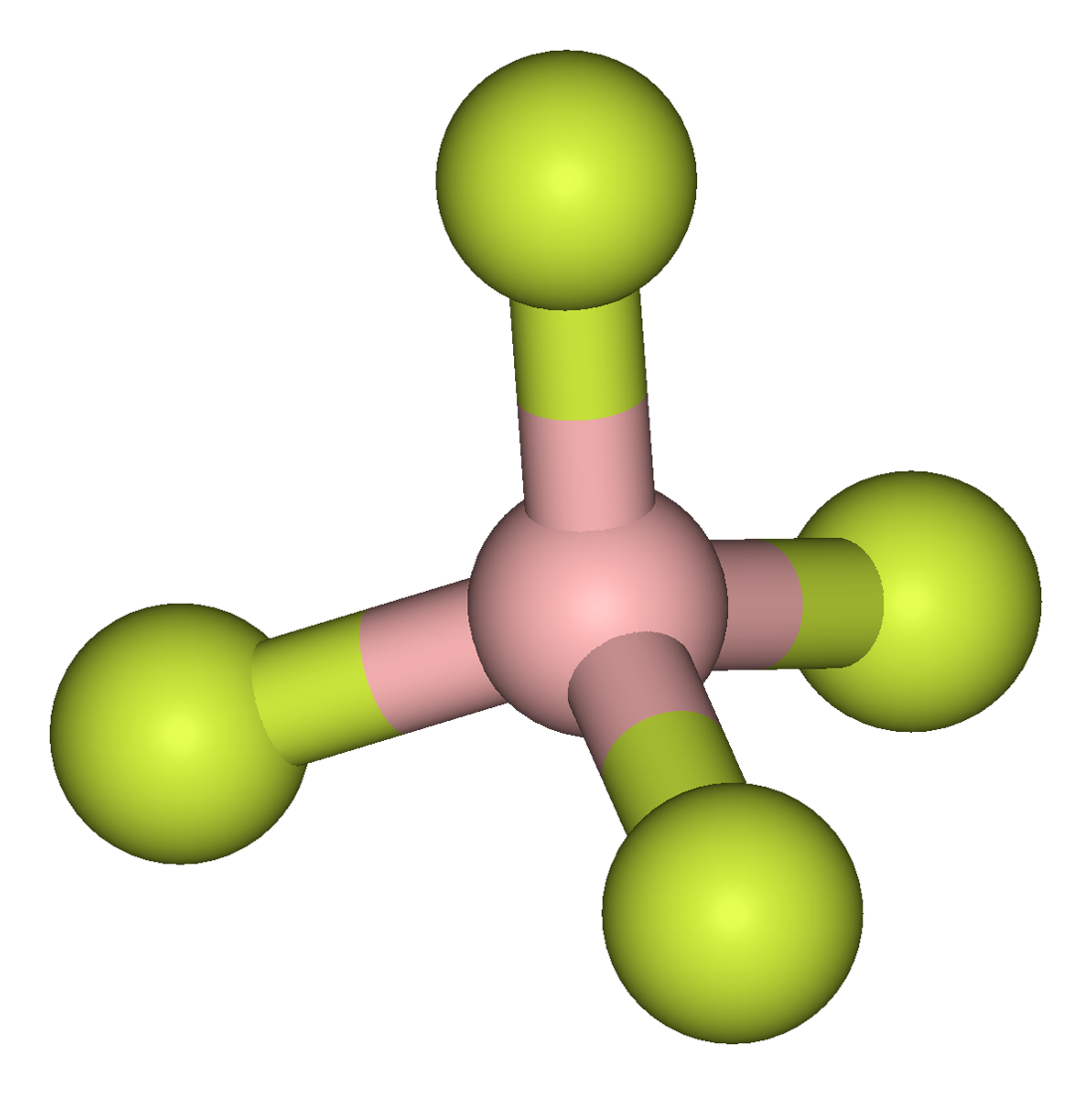
The structure of the tetrafluoroborate anion, BF^{−}_{4}

Tetrafluoroborate is the anion BF^{−}_{4}. This tetrahedral species is isoelectronic with tetrafluoroberyllate (BeF^{2−}_{4}), tetrafluoromethane (CF_{4}), and tetrafluoroammonium (NF^{+}_{4}) and is valence isoelectronic with many stable and important species including the perchlorate anion, ClO^{−}_{4}, which is used in similar ways in the laboratory. It arises by the reaction of fluoride salts with the Lewis acid BF_{3}, treatment of tetrafluoroboric acid with base, or by treatment of boric acid with hydrofluoric acid.

== As an anion in inorganic and organic chemistry ==
The popularization of BF^{−}_{4} has led to decreased use of ClO^{−}_{4} in the laboratory as a weakly coordinating anion. With organic compounds, especially amine derivatives, ClO^{−}_{4} forms potentially explosive derivatives. Disadvantages to BF^{−}_{4} include its slight sensitivity to hydrolysis and decomposition via loss of a fluoride ligand, whereas ClO^{−}_{4} does not suffer from these problems. Safety considerations, however, overshadow this inconvenience.

With a formula weight of 86.8, BF^{−}_{4} is also conveniently the smallest weakly coordinating anion from the point of view of equivalent weight, often making it the anion of choice for preparing cationic reagents or catalysts for use in synthesis, in the absence of other substantial differences in chemical or physical factors.

The BF^{−}_{4} anion is less nucleophilic and basic (and therefore more weakly coordinating) than nitrates, halides or even triflates. Thus, when using salts of BF^{−}_{4}, it is usually assumed that the cation is the reactive agent and this tetrahedral anion is inert. It owes its inertness to two factors:

1. It is symmetrical so that the negative charge is distributed equally over four atoms.
2. It is composed of highly electronegative fluorine atoms, which diminish the basicity of the anion.

In addition to the weakly coordinating nature of the anion, BF^{−}_{4} salts are often more soluble in organic solvents (lipophilic) than the related nitrate or halide salts. Related anions are hexafluorophosphate (PF^{−}_{6}), and hexafluoroantimonate (SbF^{−}_{6}), both of which are even more stable toward hydrolysis and other chemical reactions and whose salts tend to be more lipophilic.

Extremely reactive cations such as those derived from Ti, Zr, Hf, and Si do in fact abstract fluoride from BF^{−}_{4}, so in such cases it is not an "innocent" anion and weakly coordinating anions (e.g., SbF^{−}_{6}, BARF^{−}, or [Al((CF_{3})_{3}CO)_{4}]^{−}) must be employed. Moreover, in other cases of ostensibly "cationic" complexes, the fluorine atom in fact acts as a bridging ligand between boron and the cationic center. For instance, the gold complex [μ-(DTBM-SEGPHOS)(Au−BF_{4})_{2}] was found crystallographically to contain two Au−F−B bridges.

Transition and heavy metal fluoroborates are produced in the same manner as other fluoroborate salts; the respective metal salts are added to reacted boric and hydrofluoric acids. Tin, lead, copper, and nickel fluoroborates are prepared through electrolysis of these metals in a solution containing HBF_{4}.

== As a fluoride donor ==
Despite the low reactivity of the tetrafluoroborate anion in general, BF^{−}_{4} serves as a fluorine source to deliver an equivalent of fluoride. The Balz–Schiemann reaction for the synthesis of aryl fluorides is the best known example of such a reaction. Ether and halopyridine adducts of HBF_{4} have been reported to be effective reagents for the hydrofluorination of alkynes.

== Examples of salts ==
Potassium tetrafluoroborate is obtained by treating potassium carbonate with boric acid and hydrofluoric acid.

B(OH)_{3} + 4 HF → HBF_{4} + 3 H_{2}O
2 HBF_{4} + K_{2}CO_{3} → 2 KBF_{4} + H_{2}CO_{3}

Fluoroborates of alkali metals and ammonium ions crystallize as water-soluble hydrates with the exception of potassium, rubidium, and cesium.

Fluoroborate is often used to isolate highly electrophilic cations. Some examples include:

- Solvated proton (H^{+} (solv.), fluoroboric acid), including H^{+}·(H_{2}O)_{n} ("hydronium"), H^{+}·(Et_{2}O)_{n}.
- Diazonium compounds (ArN^{+}_{2}).
- Meerwein reagents such as OEt^{+}_{3}, the strongest commercial alkylating agents.
- Nitrosonium tetrafluoroborate (NOBF_{4}) a one-electron oxidizing agent and nitrosylation reagent.
- Nitronium tetrafluoroborate (NO_{2}BF_{4}), a nitration reagent.
- Ferrocenium, Fe(C_{5}H_{5})^{+}_{2}, and other cationic metallocenes.
- [Ni(CH_{3}CH_{2}OH)_{6}](BF_{4})_{2}.
- Selectfluor, a fluorination agent, and other N−F electrophilic fluorine sources.
- Bromonium and iodonium species, including py_{2}X^{+} (X = Br; X = I: Barluenga's reagent) and Ar_{2}I^{+} (diaryliodonium salts).
- Silver tetrafluoroborate and thallium tetrafluoroborate are convenient halide abstracting agents (although the thallium salt is highly toxic). Most other transition metal tetrafluoroborates only exist as solvates of water, alcohols, ethers, or nitriles.
- Transition metal nitrile complexes, e.g. [Cu(NCMe)_{4}]BF_{4}.

An electrochemical cycle involving ferrous/ferric tetrafluoroborate is being used to replace thermal smelting of lead sulfide ores by the Doe Run Company.

Imidazolium and formamidinium salts, ionic liquids and precursors to stable carbenes, are often isolated as tetrafluoroborates.

== See also ==
- Non-coordinating anion
- Fluoroboric acid
