= Diazonium compound =

Group of organonitrogen compounds

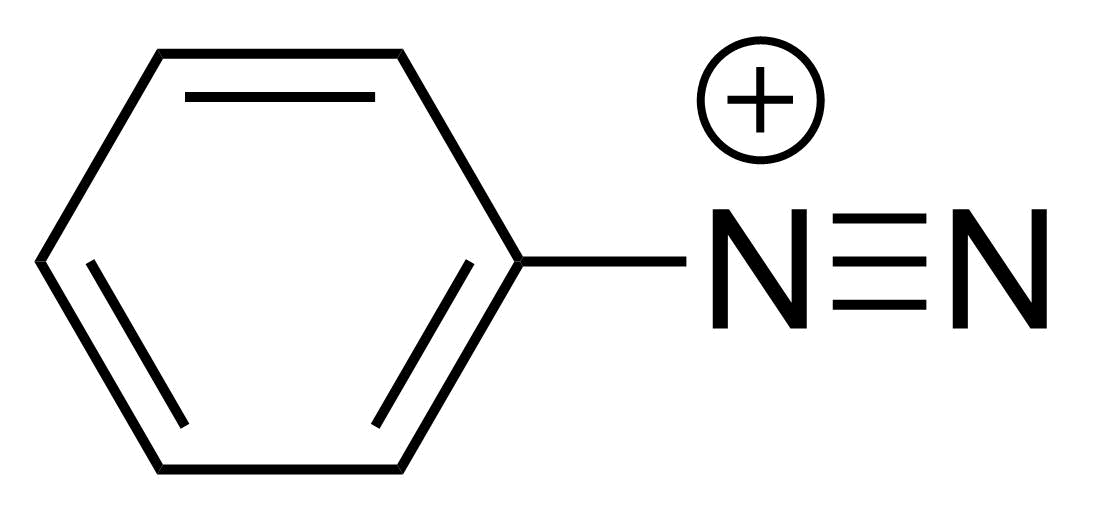
Benzenediazonium cation

Diazonium compounds or diazonium salts are a group of organic compounds sharing a common functional group [R−N^{+}≡N]X^{−} where R can be any organic group, such as an alkyl or an aryl, and X is an inorganic or organic anion, such as a halide. The parent compound, where R is hydrogen, is diazenylium.

== Structure and general properties ==
=== Arene derivatives ===
According to X-ray crystallography the C−N^{+}≡N linkage is linear in typical diazonium salts. The N^{+}≡N bond distance in benzenediazonium tetrafluoroborate is 1.083(3) Å, which is almost identical to that for dinitrogen molecule (N≡N).

The linear free energy constants σ_{m} and σ_{p} indicate that the diazonium group is one of the most strongly electron-withdrawing substituents known. Thus, the diazonio-substituted phenols and benzoic acids have greatly reduced pK_{a} values compared to their unsubstituted counterparts. The pK_{a} of phenolic proton of 4-hydroxybenzenediazonium is 3.4, versus 9.9 for phenol itself. In other words, the diazonium group raises the ionization constant K_{a} (enhances the acidity) by a million-fold. This also causes arenediazonium salts to have decreased reactivity when electron-donating groups are present on the aromatic ring.

The stability of arenediazonium salts is highly sensitive to the counterion. Benzenediazonium chloride is dangerously explosive, whereas benzenediazonium tetrafluoroborate has been described as shock insensitive.

=== Alkane derivatives ===
Alkanediazonium salts are generally synthetically unimportant due to their extreme and uncontrolled reactivity toward S_{N}2/S_{N}1/E1 substitution or elimination. These cations are, however, of theoretical interest for study of these reactions. Furthermore, methyldiazonium carboxylate is believed to be an intermediate in the methylation of carboxylic acids by diazomethane, a common transformation.

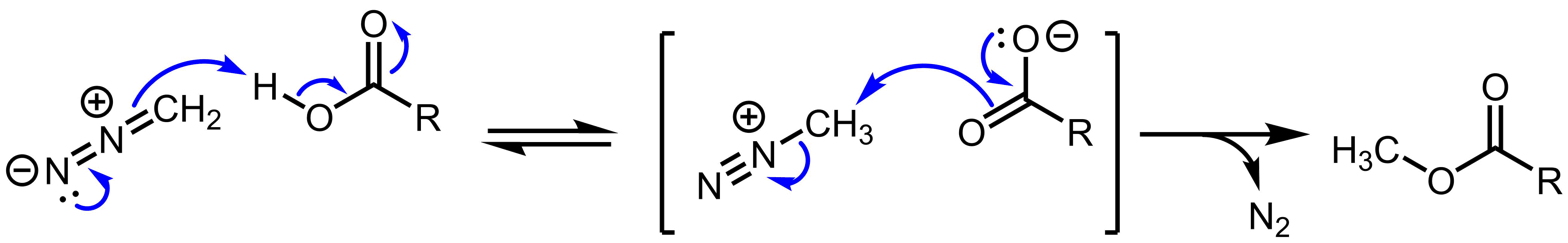
Methylation with diazomethane

With the exception of methyldiazonium, loss of N_{2} is both enthalpically accessible and entropically favorable:

[CH_{3}N_{2}]^{+} → [CH_{3}]^{+} + N_{2}, ΔH = +43 kcal/mol
[CH_{3}CH_{2}N_{2}]^{+} → [CH_{3}CH_{2}]^{+} + N_{2}, ΔH = +11 kcal/mol

For ethyl and higher primary alkanediazonium species, dediazotization takes place rapidly at room temperature and is rendered irreversible by loss of N_{2}. For secondary and tertiary alkanediazonium species, the enthalpic change is calculated to be close to zero or negative, with minimal activation barrier. Hence, secondary and (especially) tertiary alkanediazonium species are either unbound species or, at best, extremely fleeting intermediates.

The aqueous pK_{a} of methyldiazonium ([CH_{3}N_{2}]^{+}) is estimated to be <10.

== Preparation ==
The process of forming diazonium compounds is called "diazotation", "diazoniation", or "diazotization". The reaction was first reported by Peter Griess in 1858, who subsequently discovered several reactions of this new class of compounds. Most commonly, diazonium salts are prepared by treatment of aromatic amines with nitrous acid and additional acid. Usually the nitrous acid is generated in situ (in the same flask) from sodium nitrite and the excess mineral acid (usually aqueous HCl, H_{2}SO_{4}, p-H_{3}CC_{6}H_{4}SO_{3}H, or H[BF_{4}]):

ArNH_{2} + HNO_{2} + HX → [ArN_{2}]^{+}X^{−} + 2 H_{2}O

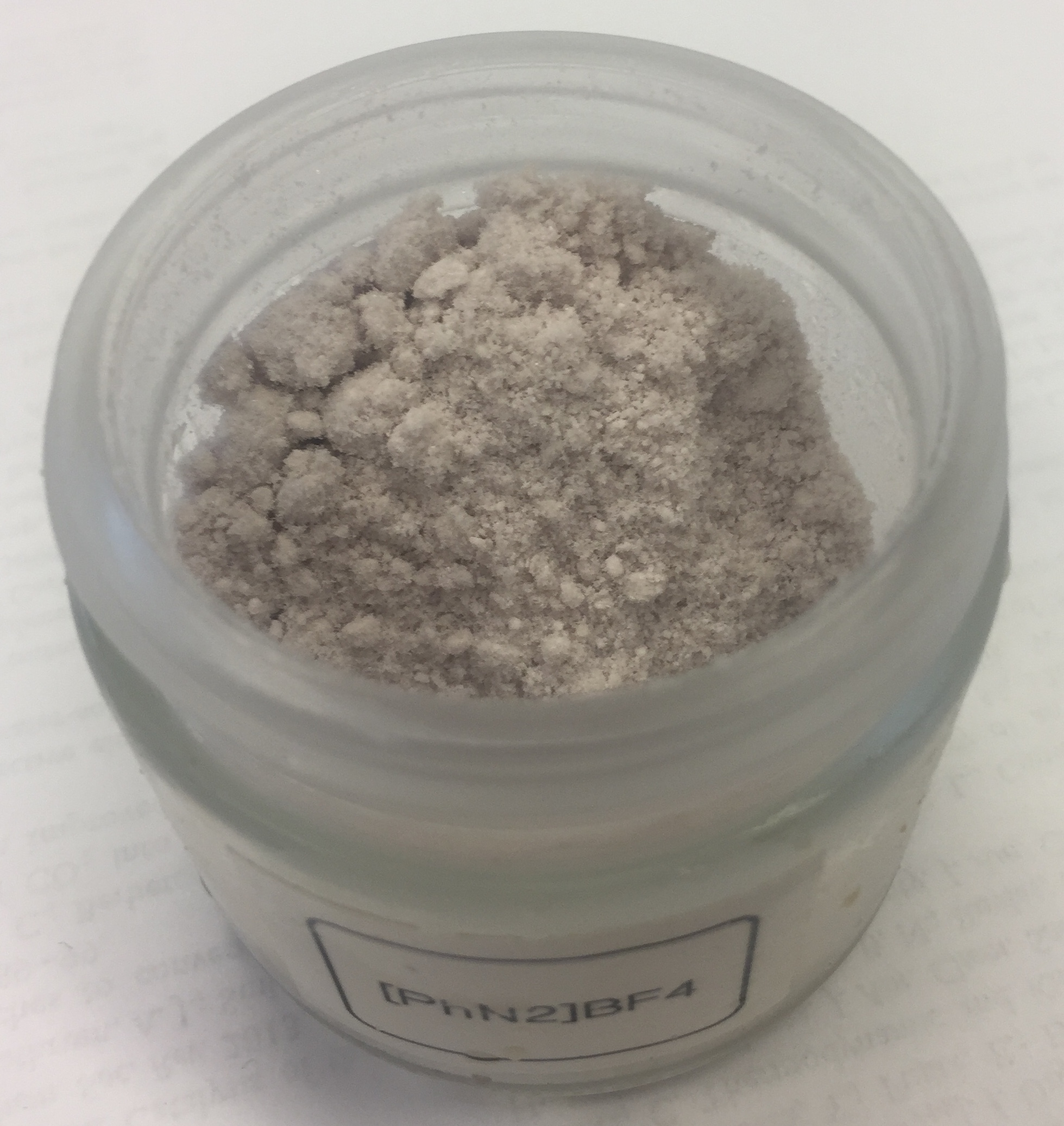
Sample of benzenediazonium tetrafluoroborate

Chloride salts of diazonium cation, traditionally prepared from the aniline, sodium nitrite, and hydrochloric acid, are unstable at room temperature and are classically prepared at 0–5 °C. However, one can isolate diazonium compounds as tetrafluoroborate or tosylate salts, which are stable solids at room temperature. It is often preferred that the diazonium salt remain in solution, but they do tend to supersaturate. Operators have been injured or even killed by an unexpected crystallization of the salt followed by its detonation.

Due to these hazards, diazonium compounds are often not isolated. Instead they are used in situ. This approach is illustrated in the preparation of an arenesulfonyl compound:

Alternatively, an easily prepared diazo cation can transfer the diazotation to another amine through a triazene intermediate (compare diazo transfer).

== Reactions ==
Arenediazonium salts are highly versatile reagents. After electrophilic aromatic substitution, diazonium chemistry is the most frequently applied strategy to prepare aromatic compounds.

In general, two reactions are possible for diazonium salts: reductive additions to arenes ("diazo coupling") and hydrazines, and substitution. The latter case is no simple S_{N}1 or S_{N}2 reaction, characterized instead by aryl radicals and cations.

=== Reductive additions ===
==== Diazo coupling ====
The first and still main use of diazonium salts is azo coupling, which is exploited in the production of azo dyes. In some cases water-fast dyed fabrics are simply immersed in an aqueous solution of the diazonium compound, followed by immersion in a solution of the coupler (the electron-rich ring that undergoes electrophilic substitution). In this process, the diazonium compound is attacked by, i.e., coupled to, electron-rich substrates. When the coupling partners are arenes such as anilines and phenols, the process is an example of electrophilic aromatic substitution:

[ArN_{2}]^{+} + Ar'H → ArN_{2}Ar' + H^{+}

The deep colors of the dyes reflects their extended conjugation. A popular azo dye is aniline yellow, produced from aniline. Naphthalen-2-ol (beta-naphthol) gives an intensely orange-red dye. Methyl orange is an example of an azo dye that is used in the laboratory as a pH indicator..

Another commercially important class of coupling partners are acetoacetic amides, as illustrated by the preparation of Pigment Yellow 12, a diarylide pigment.

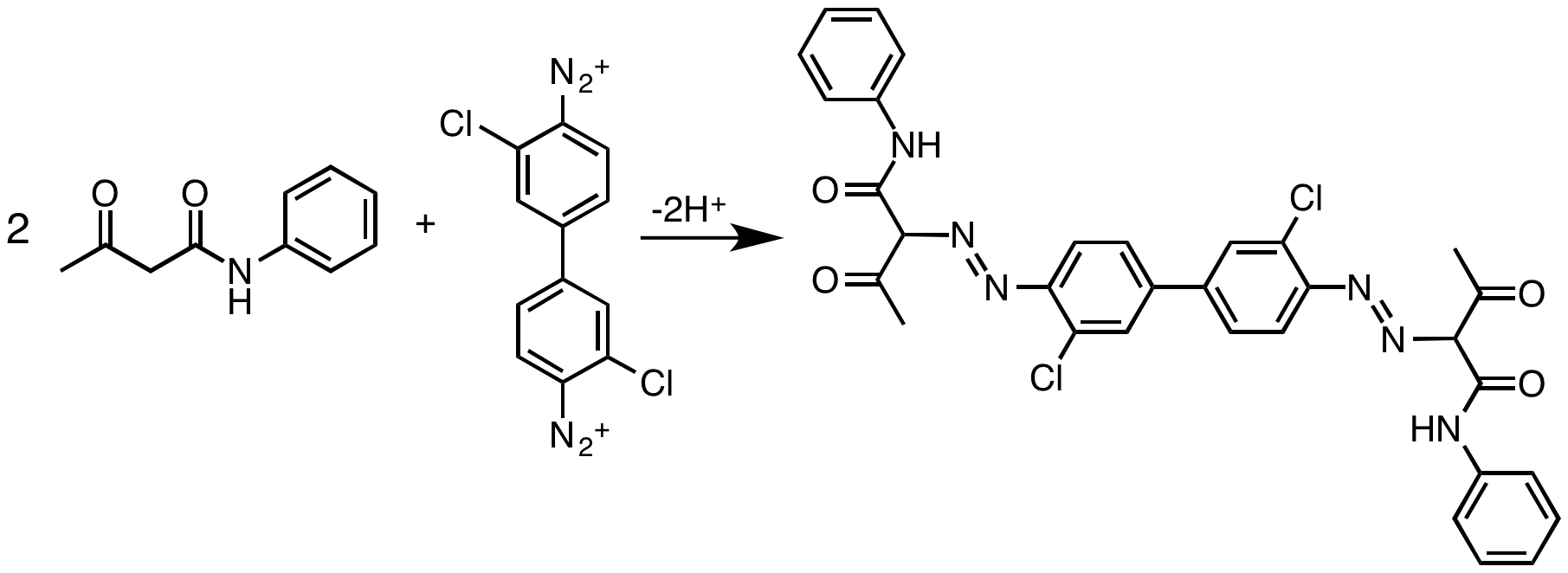

==== To hydrazines ====
Diazonium salts can be reduced with stannous chloride (SnCl_{2}) to the corresponding hydrazine derivatives. This reaction is particularly useful in the Fischer indole synthesis of triptan compounds and indometacin. The use of sodium dithionite is an improvement over stannous chloride since it is a cheaper reducing agent with fewer environmental problems.

==== Metal complexation ====
In their reactions with metal complexes, diazonium cations behave similarly to NO^{+}. For example, low-valent metal complexes add with diazonium salts. Illustrative complexes are [Fe(CO)_{2}(PPh_{3})_{2}(N_{2}Ph)]^{+} and the chiral-at-metal complex Fe(CO)(NO)(PPh_{3})(N_{2}Ph).

=== Displacement of the N_{2} group ===
Arenediazonium cations undergo several reactions in which the N_{2} group is replaced by another group or ion. The process is a formal nucleophilic aromatic substitution reaction, and the basis of the Sandmeyer Reaction, the Gomberg-Bachmann reaction and the Schiemann reaction.

The N^{+}_{2} group is extremely fragile, and displacement can be initiated by:

- organic reduction at an electrode
- mild reducing agents such as ascorbic acid (vitamin C)
- gamma radiation from solvated electrons generated in water
- photoinduced electron transfer
- reduction by metal cations, most commonly a cuprous salt.
- anion-induced dediazoniation; a counterion such as iodine gives electron transfer to the diazonium cation forming the aryl radical and an iodine radical
- solvent-induced dediazoniation with solvent serving as electron donor.

Nevertheless, N_{2} departure is also somewhat reversible, as indicated by the isotope scrambling of the nitrogen atoms.

In many applications, the diazonium salt is produced in situ, to avoid premature reaction. In the so-called Craig method, 2-aminopyridine reacts with sodium nitrite, hydrobromic acid, and excess bromine to 2-bromopyridine.

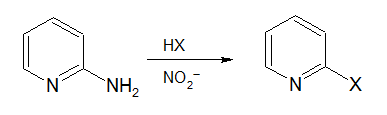

==== By halides ====
In the Sandmeyer Reaction, benzenediazonium chloride heated with copper(I) dissolved in HCl or HBr yields chlorobenzene or bromobenzene, respectively:

[C_{6}H_{5}N_{2}]^{+} + CuCl → C_{6}H_{5}Cl + N_{2} + Cu^{+}

The copper salt can be formed in situ from copper powder, at the cost of a biaryl byproduct (see § Biaryl coupling):

2 Cu + 2 [C_{6}H_{5}N_{2}]^{+} → 2 Cu^{+} + (C_{6}H_{5})_{2} + 2 N_{2} (initiation)
[C_{6}H_{5}N_{2}]^{+} + HX → C_{6}H_{5}X + N_{2} + H^{+} (Cu^{+} catalysis)

Potassium iodide does not require the copper catalyst:

[C_{6}H_{5}N_{2}]^{+} + KI → C_{6}H_{5}I + K^{+} + N_{2}

Fluorobenzene is produced by thermal decomposition of benzenediazonium tetrafluoroborate. The conversion is called the Balz–Schiemann reaction.

[C_{6}H_{5}N_{2}]^{+}[BF_{4}]^{−} → C_{6}H_{5}F + BF_{3} + N_{2}

The traditional Balz–Schiemann reaction has been the subject of many modification, e.g. using hexafluorophosphate(V) ([PF_{6}]^{−}) and hexafluoroantimonate(V) ([SbF_{6}]^{−}) in place of tetrafluoroborate ([BF_{4}]^{−}). The inertness of fluoroanions allows the diazotization to be performed simultaneous with anion introduction, e.g. with nitrosonium hexafluoroantimonate(V) ([NO]^{+}[SbF_{6}]^{−}).

==== By a hydroxyl group ====
Phenols are produced by heating aqueous solutions of arenediazonium salts:

[C_{6}H_{5}N_{2}]^{+} + H_{2}O → C_{6}H_{5}OH + N_{2} + H^{+}

This reaction goes by the German name Phenolverkochung ("cooking down to yield phenols"). The phenol formed may react with the diazonium salt and hence the reaction is carried in the presence of an acid which suppresses this further reaction. A Sandmeyer-type hydroxylation is also possible using Cu_{2}O and Cu^{2+} in water.

==== By inorganic anions ====
Nitrobenzene can be obtained by treating benzenediazonium fluoroborate with sodium nitrite in presence of copper. Alternatively, the diazotisation of the aniline can be conducted in presence of cuprous oxide, which generates cuprous nitrite in situ:

[C_{6}H_{5}N_{2}]^{+} + CuNO_{2} → C_{6}H_{5}NO_{2} + N_{2} + Cu^{+}

Nucleophilic aromatic substitution of haloarenes can rarely introduce cyanide moieties, but such compounds can be easily prepared from diazonium salts. Illustrative is the preparation of benzonitrile using the reagent cuprous cyanide:

[C_{6}H_{5}N_{2}]^{+} + CuCN → C_{6}H_{5}CN + Cu^{+} + N_{2}

Diazonium salts cannot be converted directly to thiols. But in the Leuckart thiophenol reaction, displacement of benzenediazonium chloride with potassium ethylxanthate gives an intermediate xanthate ester that hydrolyzes to thiophenol:

[C_{6}H_{5}N_{2}]^{+} + C_{2}H_{5}OCS^{−}_{2} → C_{6}H_{5}SC(S)OC_{2}H_{5} + N_{2}
C_{6}H_{5}SC(S)OC_{2}H_{5} + H_{2}O → C_{6}H_{5}SH + HOC(S)OC_{2}H_{5}

==== By carbanion equivalents ====
In the Meerwein arylation, benzenediazonium chloride reacts with compounds containing activated double bonds to produce phenylated products:

[C_{6}H_{5}N_{2}]^{+}Cl^{−} + ArCH=CH−COOH → ArCH=CH−C_{6}H_{5} + N_{2} + CO_{2} + HCl

Two research groups reported trifluoromethylations of diazonium salts in 2013. Goossen reported the preparation of a CuCF_{3} complex from CuSCN, TMSCF_{3}, and Cs_{2}CO_{3}. In contrast, Fu reported the trifluoromethylation using Umemoto's reagent (S-trifluoromethyldibenzothiophenium tetrafluoroborate) and Cu powder (Gattermann-type conditions). They can be described by the following equation:

[C_{6}H_{5}N_{2}]^{+} + [CuCF_{3}] → C_{6}H_{5}CF_{3} + [Cu]^{+} + N_{2}

The bracket indicates that other ligands on copper are likely present but are omitted.

A formyl group, –CHO, can be introduced by treating the aryl diazonium salt with formaldoxime (H_{2}C=NOH), followed by hydrolysis of the aryl aldoxime to give the aryl aldehyde. This reaction is known as the Beech reaction.

==== Biaryl coupling ====
One aryl group can be coupled to another using arenediazonium salts. For example, treatment of benzenediazonium chloride with benzene (an aromatic compound) in the presence of sodium hydroxide gives diphenyl:

[C_{6}H_{5}N_{2}]^{+}Cl^{−} + C_{6}H_{6} → (C_{6}H_{5})_{2} + N_{2} + HCl

This reaction is known as the Gomberg–Bachmann reaction. A similar conversion is also achieved by treating benzenediazonium chloride with ethanol and copper powder.

Alternatively, a pair of diazonium cations can be coupled to give biaryls. This conversion is illustrated by the coupling of the diazonium salt derived from anthranilic acid to give diphenic acid ((C_{6}H_{4}CO_{2}H)_{2}). In a related reaction, the same diazonium salt undergoes loss of N_{2} and CO_{2} to give benzyne.

==== By hydrogen ====
Arenediazonium cations reduced by hypophosphorous acid, ethanol, sodium stannite or alkaline sodium thiosulphate give the unsubstituted arene:

[C_{6}H_{5}N_{2}]^{+}Cl^{−} + H_{3}PO_{2} + H_{2}O → C_{6}H_{6} + N_{2} + H_{3}PO_{3} + HCl
[C_{6}H_{5}N_{2}]^{+}Cl^{−} + CH_{3}CH_{2}OH → C_{6}H_{6} + N_{2} + CH_{3}CHO + HCl
[C_{6}H_{5}N_{2}]^{+}Cl^{−} + NaOH + Na_{2}SnO_{2} → C_{6}H_{6} + N_{2} + Na_{2}SnO_{3} + NaCl

An alternative way suggested by Baeyer & Pfitzinger is to replace the diazo group with H is: first to convert it into hydrazine by treating with SnCl_{2} then to oxidize it into hydrocarbon by boiling with cupric sulphate solution.

==== Borylation ====
A Bpin (pinacolatoboron) group, of use in Suzuki-Miyaura cross coupling reactions, can be installed by reaction of a diazonium salt with bis(pinacolato)diboron in the presence of benzoyl peroxide (2 mol %) as an initiator: Alternatively similar borylation can be achieved using transition metal carbonyl complexes including dimanganese decacarbonyl.

[C_{6}H_{5}N_{2}]^{+}X^{−} + pinB−Bpin → C_{6}H_{5}Bpin + X−Bpin + N_{2}

==== Grafting reactions ====
In a potential application in nanotechnology, the diazonium salts 4-chlorobenzenediazonium tetrafluoroborate very efficiently functionalizes single wall nanotubes. In order to exfoliate the nanotubes, they are mixed with an ionic liquid in a mortar and pestle. The diazonium salt is added together with potassium carbonate, and after grinding the mixture at room temperature the surface of the nanotubes are covered with chlorophenyl groups with an efficiency of 1 in 44 carbon atoms. These added substituents prevent the tubes from forming intimate bundles due to large cohesive forces between them, which is a recurring problem in nanotube technology.

It is also possible to functionalize silicon wafers with diazonium salts forming an aryl monolayer. In one study, the silicon surface is washed with ammonium hydrogen fluoride leaving it covered with silicon–hydrogen bonds (hydride passivation). The reaction of the surface with a solution of diazonium salt in acetonitrile for 2 hours in the dark is a spontaneous process through a free radical mechanism:

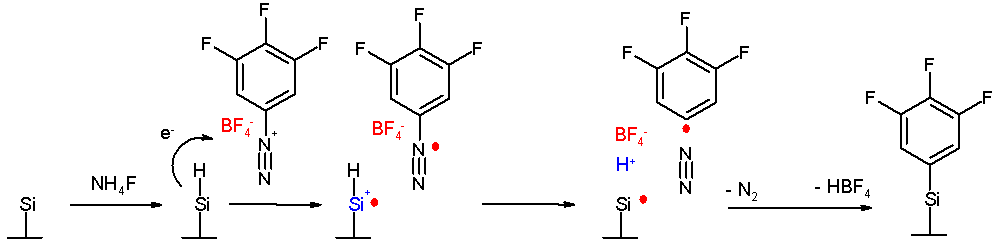
Diazonium salt application silicon wafer

So far, grafting of diazonium salts on metals has been accomplished on iron, cobalt, nickel, platinum, palladium, zinc, copper, and gold surfaces. Also grafting to diamond surfaces has been reported. One interesting question raised is the actual positioning on the aryl group on the surface. An in silico study demonstrates that in the period 4 elements from titanium to copper the binding energy decreases from left to right because the number of d-electrons increases. The metals to the left of iron are positioned tilted toward or flat on the surface favoring metal to carbon pi bond formation and those on the right of iron are positioned in an upright position, favoring metal to carbon sigma bond formation. This also explains why diazonium salt grafting thus far has been possible with those metals to right of iron in the periodic table.

== Biochemistry ==
Alkanediazonium ions, otherwise rarely encountered in organic chemistry, are implicated as the causative agents in the carcinogens. Specifically, nitrosamines are thought to undergo metabolic activation to produce alkanediazonium species.

Metabolic activation of the nitrosamine NDMA, involving its conversion to an alkylating agent

== Safety ==
Solid diazonium halides are often dangerously explosive. Injuries and fatalities have been reported. The explosion risk of isolated diazonium salts can be circumvented by generating them in situ via the rate-limiting reduction of nitrate. This method keeps the intermediate concentration near zero, preventing the buildup of shock-sensitive compounds during reaction scale-up.

The nature of the anions affects stability of the salt. Arenediazonium perchlorates, such as nitrobenzenediazonium perchlorate, have been used to initiate explosives.

== See also ==
- Benzenediazonium tetrafluoroborate
- Diazo
- Transition metal dinitrogen complex
- Triazene cleavage
- Whiteprint, a diazo printing process
