= Oxonium hexafluorouranate =

Identifiers
3D model (JSmol)	Interactive image
- InChI: InChI=1S/6FH.H2O.U/h6*1H;1H2;/q;;;;;;;+5/p-5 Key: QNFXVKQSTCPUQS-UHFFFAOYSA-I
- SMILES: [OH3+].F[U-](F)(F)(F)(F)F

Properties
Chemical formula	F_{6}H_{3}OU
Molar mass	371.042 g·mol^{−1}
Appearance	green crystals

Related compounds
Other anions	Hydronium perchlorate; Hydronium hexafluoroarsenate; Hydronium hexafluoroantimonate
- Except where otherwise noted, data are given for materials in their standard state (at 25 °C [77 °F], 100 kPa). Infobox references

Oxonium hexafluorouranate is an inorganic compound with the chemical formula H_{3}OUF_{6}, composed of the hydroxonium cation [H_{3}O]^{+} and hexafluorouranate anion [UF_{6}]^{-}.

== Preparation ==
It can be formed by mixing equimolar amounts of uranium pentafluoride (UF_{5}) and water (H_{2}O) in hydrogen fluoride (HF).

H_{2}O + HF + UF_{5} → H_{3}OUF_{6}
