= Hexafluorouranate =

Type of anion

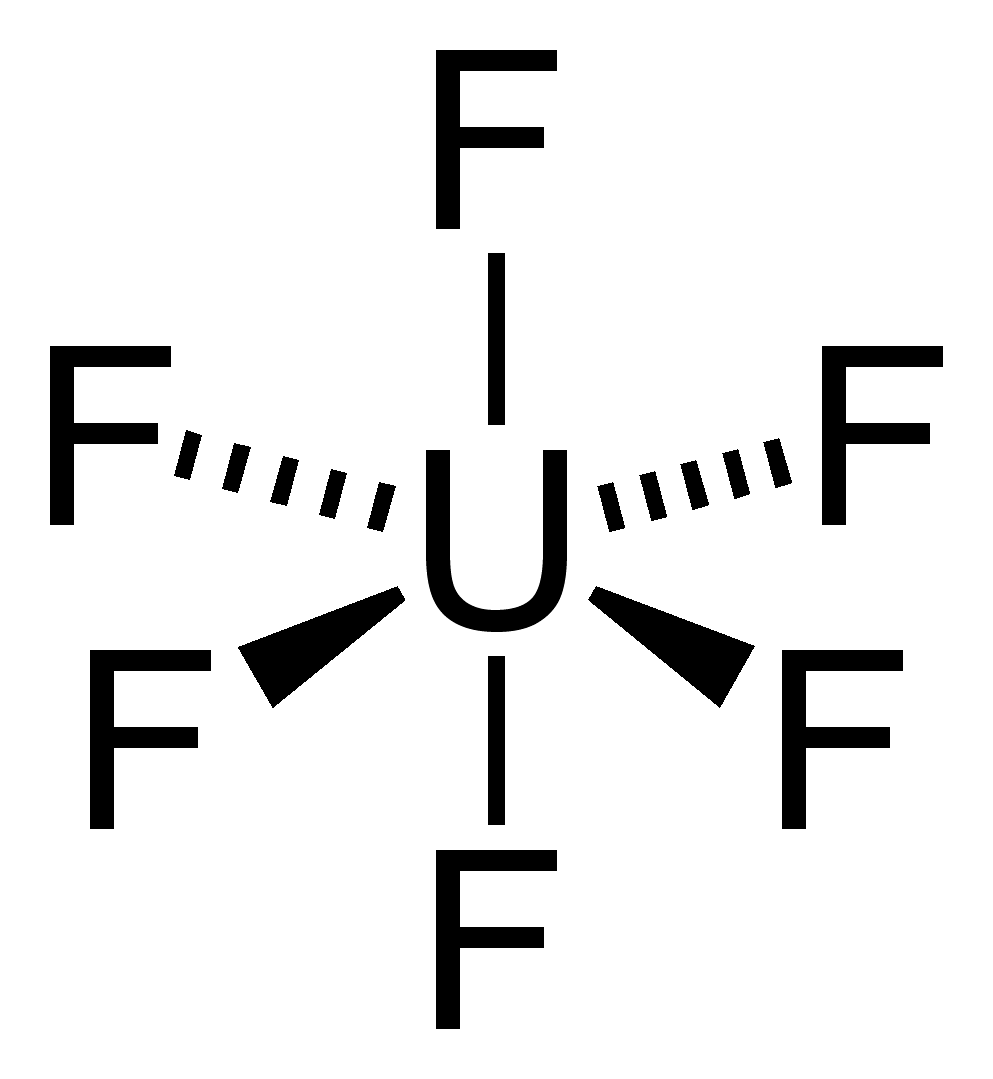
Uranium hexafluoride, the building block of hexafluorouranates.

Hexafluorouranate is an octahedral anion made of six fluorine atoms and one uranium atom. It is most commonly found in the +4 or +5 oxidation states. It can be produced by combining cations with uranium hexafluoride.

== Examples of hexafluorouranates ==
There are six alkali metal hexafluorouranates, which include lithium, sodium, potassium, rubidium, and two salts of caesium, one of which uses the uranium in the +4 oxidation state, the other in +5. Francium is most likely too unstable to produce a hexafluorouranate.

Other metallic hexafluorouranates include copper, silver, cadmium, and thallium.

Nitrogen-oxygen hexafluorouranates include nitrosonium and nitronium, the first of which can be combined with an alkali metal nitrate to form the alkali metal hexafluorouranate.

Other hexafluorouranates include hydrogen, hydroxylammonium, oxonium, bis(acetonitrile)iodine, tris(acetonitrile)bromine, dicarbonylgold, bis(carbonyl)silver, and tetraethylammonium.

Bis(acetonitrile)iodine and tris(acetonitrile)bromine are synthesized by letting iodine or bromine get oxidized by uranium hexafluoride in acetonitrile. So far, we have only synthesized it with these two halogens, but theoretically, chlorine and fluorine should work too.

== Reactions ==
Nitrosonium hexafluorouranate, when combined with any alkali metal nitrate from lithium to caesium can create the alkali metal hexafluorouranate along with two nitrogen dioxide molecules.

== Other ==
All "hexafluoro complexes" seem to line up with perchlorates, i.e. oxonium hexafluorouranate and hydronium perchlorate, or copper(II) hexafluoroantimonate and copper(II) perchlorate.
