= Long-chain-fatty-acyl-CoA reductase =

long-chain-fatty-acyl-CoA reductase

Identifiers
- EC no.: 1.2.1.50
- CAS no.: 50936-56-6

Databases
- IntEnz: IntEnz view
- BRENDA: BRENDA entry
- ExPASy: NiceZyme view
- KEGG: KEGG entry
- MetaCyc: metabolic pathway
- PRIAM: profile
- PDB structures: RCSB PDB PDBe PDBsum
- Gene Ontology: AmiGO / QuickGO
Search
- PMC: articles
- PubMed: articles
- NCBI: proteins

In enzymology, a long-chain-fatty-acyl-CoA reductase (EC 1.2.1.50) is an enzyme that catalyzes the chemical reaction

a long-chain aldehyde + CoA + NADP^{+} $\rightleftharpoons$ a long-chain acyl-CoA + NADPH + H^{+}

The 3 substrates of this enzyme are long-chain aldehyde, CoA, and NADP^{+}, whereas its 3 products are long-chain acyl-CoA, NADPH, and H^{+}.

This enzyme belongs to the family of oxidoreductases, specifically those acting on the aldehyde or oxo group of donor with NAD+ or NADP+ as acceptor. The systematic name of this enzyme class is long-chain-aldehyde:NADP+ oxidoreductase (acyl-CoA-forming). Other names in common use include acyl-CoA reductase, and acyl coenzyme A reductase.
