= Lithium hexafluorotungstate =

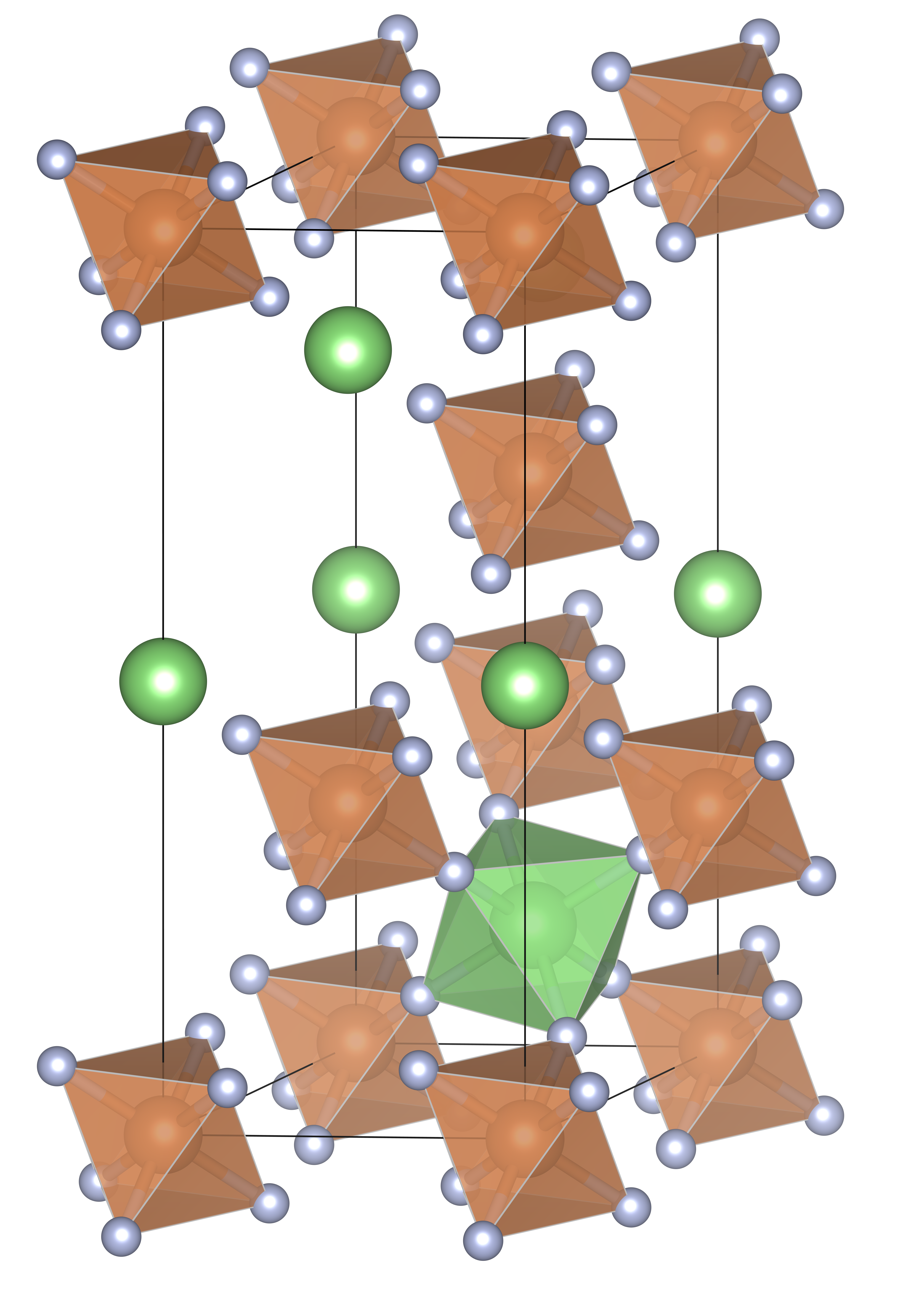

Names
- Other names Lithium hexafluorotungstate(V)

Identifiers
CAS Number	65629-56-3
3D model (JSmol)	Interactive image
- InChI: InChI=1S/6FH.Li.W/h6*1H;;/q;;;;;;+1;+5/p-6 Key: QVIONVCQUNIUMJ-UHFFFAOYSA-H
- SMILES: [Li+].[F-][W+5]([F-])([F-])([F-])([F-])[F-]

Properties
Chemical formula	LiWF_{6}
- Except where otherwise noted, data are given for materials in their standard state (at 25 °C [77 °F], 100 kPa). Infobox references

Lithium hexafluorotungstate is an inorganic chemical compound with the chemical formula LiWF_{6}.

== Synthesis ==
Lithium hexafluorotungstate can be prepared by reacting lithium iodide and tungsten hexafluoride in liquid sulfur dioxide.

== Physical properties ==
The compound has the LiSbF_{6} structure with unit cell parameters a=5.45 Å, α=57.4°.

== Chemical properties ==
Lithium hexafluorotungstenate is unstable and decomposes in a vacuum at 50 °C. It can react in an alkaline solution of hypochlorite as follows:

2 LiWF_{6} + ClO^{−} + 14 OH^{−} → 2 Li^{+} + 2 WO_{4}^{2−} + Cl^{−} + 12 F^{−} + 7 H_{2}O
