= Europium(II) perchlorate =

Names
- Other names Europous perchlorate

Identifiers
CAS Number	16645-73-1
3D model (JSmol)	Interactive image; hexahydrate: Interactive image
PubChem CID	159509049; hexahydrate: 173351952
- InChI: InChI=1S/2ClHO4.Eu/c2*2-1(3,4)5;/h2*(H,2,3,4,5);/q;;+2/p-2 Key: MAJHIPVPLPOAEE-UHFFFAOYSA-L; hexahydrate: InChI=1S/2ClO4.Eu.6H2O/c2*2-1(3,4)5;;;;;;;/h;;;6*1H2/q2*-1;+2;;;;;; Key: FGMMWEMKKSLREB-UHFFFAOYSA-N
- SMILES: [O-]Cl(=O)(=O)=O.[O-]Cl(=O)(=O)=O.[Eu+2]; hexahydrate: O.O.O.O.O.O.[O-][Cl+3]([O-])([O-])[O-].[O-][Cl+3]([O-])([O-])[O-].[Eu+2]

Properties
Chemical formula	Eu(ClO_{4})_{2}
Molar mass	350.87 g/mol
Appearance	Hygroscopic crystalline solid
Solubility in water	Soluble in water
- Except where otherwise noted, data are given for materials in their standard state (at 25 °C [77 °F], 100 kPa). Infobox references

Europium(II) perchlorate is an inorganic compound of europium in the +2 oxidation state and the perchlorate ion, with the formula Eu(ClO_{4})_{2}. It is a hygroscopic salt and is principally studied in aqueous solution as a source of Eu^{2+}.

== Preparation ==
Europium(II) perchlorate can be prepared by dissolving a slight excess of europium(II) carbonate in approximately 50% perchloric acid.

EuCO_{3} + 2 HClO_{4} → Eu(ClO_{4})_{2} + CO_{2} + H_{2}O

Because Eu^{2+} is readily oxidized to Eu^{3+}, preparation and handling are normally carried out under conditions that minimize exposure to oxidizing agents.

== Properties ==
=== Redox and photochemical behavior ===
Europium(II) perchlorate is a reducing agent in acidic aqueous solution. Under ultraviolet or visible irradiation, Eu^{2+} is photooxidized to Eu^{3+} while protons are reduced to hydrogen:

2 Eu^{2+} + 2 H^{+} → 2 Eu^{3+} + H_{2}

The quantum yield for hydrogen formation increases with decreasing irradiation wavelength. In 1 M perchloric acid at 296 K, reported values ranged from approximately 0.053 at 405 nm to 0.20 at 254 nm.

Scavenging experiments indicated formation of hydrogen atoms in the bulk solution during photolysis. A mechanism involving geminate Eu(III)–H radical pairs was proposed.

=== Coordination chemistry ===
Europium(II) perchlorate is useful as a source of Eu^{2+} for the preparation of coordination compounds with macrocyclic ligands. Complexes with crown ethers are known. Reaction with dibenzo-18-crown-6 gives solid Eu(II) perchlorate crown-ether complexes. Related Eu(II) crown-ether chemistry includes structurally characterized complexes in which europium reaches coordination numbers of nine or ten, reflecting the large ionic radius of Eu^{2+}.
