= Aldose 1-dehydrogenase =

aldose 1-dehydrogenase

Identifiers
- EC no.: 1.1.1.121
- CAS no.: 9076-61-3

Databases
- IntEnz: IntEnz view
- BRENDA: BRENDA entry
- ExPASy: NiceZyme view
- KEGG: KEGG entry
- MetaCyc: metabolic pathway
- PRIAM: profile
- PDB structures: RCSB PDB PDBe PDBsum
- Gene Ontology: AmiGO / QuickGO
Search
- PMC: articles
- PubMed: articles
- NCBI: proteins

In enzymology, an aldose 1-dehydrogenase (EC 1.1.1.121) is an enzyme that catalyzes the chemical reaction

D-aldose + NAD^{+} $\rightleftharpoons$ D-aldonolactone + NADH + H^{+}

Thus, the two substrates of this enzyme are D-aldose and NAD^{+}, whereas its 3 products are D-aldonolactone, NADH, and H^{+}.

This enzyme belongs to the family of oxidoreductases, specifically those acting on the CH-OH group of donor with NAD^{+} or NADP^{+} as acceptor. The systematic name of this enzyme class is D-aldose:NAD^{+} 1-oxidoreductase. Other names in common use include aldose dehydrogenase, and dehydrogenase, D-aldohexose.
