= Copper(II) nitrosohexafluoroantimonate =

Properties
Chemical formula	NOCu(SbF_{6})_{3}
Molar mass	800.803 g·mol^{−1}
Density	3.5048 g/cm^{3}

Structure
Crystal structure	Orthorhombic
Space group	Pnma (No. 62)
Lattice constant	a = 10.8116 Å, b = 14.4267 Å, c = 9.7228 Å
Lattice volume (V)	1516.52 Å^{3}
Formula units (Z)	4 units per cell

Related compounds
Other cations	Copper(II) hexafluoroantimonate; Nitrosonium hexafluoroantimonate
Related compounds	Fluoroantimonic acid
- Except where otherwise noted, data are given for materials in their standard state (at 25 °C [77 °F], 100 kPa). Infobox references

Copper(II) nitrosohexafluoroantimonate is an inorganic compound with the chemical formula NOCu(SbF_{6})_{3}, composed of the nitrosonium and copper(II) cations [NO]^{+} and [Cu]^{2+}, and the hexafluoroantimonate anion [SbF_{6}]^{-}.

== Structure ==
The structure is orthorhombic (space group Pnma), isotypic to that of ANi(AsF_{6})_{3} (A=H_{3}O^{+}, O_{2}^{+}, NO^{+}, NH_{4}^{+}, K^{+}, Rb^{+} and Cs^{+}). It consists of rings of CuF_{6} octahedra sharing apexes with SbF_{6} octahedra connected in a three-dimensional Cu(SbF_{6})_{3} network. Cavities are formed where the NO^{+} cations are located.

== Preparation ==
Copper(II) nitrosohexafluoroantimonate is formed by reacting nitrosonium hexafluoroantimonate and copper(II) hexafluoroantimonate in anhydrous hydrofluoric acid.
