= NADPH peroxidase =

Identifiers
- EC no.: 1.11.1.2
- CAS no.: 9029-51-0

Databases
- IntEnz: IntEnz view
- BRENDA: BRENDA entry
- ExPASy: NiceZyme view
- KEGG: KEGG entry
- MetaCyc: metabolic pathway
- PRIAM: profile
- PDB structures: RCSB PDB PDBe PDBsum
- Gene Ontology: AmiGO / QuickGO
Search
- PMC: articles
- PubMed: articles
- NCBI: proteins

In enzymology, a NADPH peroxidase (EC 1.11.1.2) is an enzyme that catalyzes the chemical reaction

NADPH + H^{+} + H_{2}O_{2} $\rightleftharpoons$ NADP^{+} + 2 H_{2}O

The 3 substrates of this enzyme are NADPH, H^{+}, and H_{2}O_{2}, whereas its two products are NADP^{+} and H_{2}O.

This enzyme belongs to the family of oxidoreductases, specifically those acting on a peroxide as acceptor (peroxidases). The systematic name of this enzyme class is NADPH:hydrogen-peroxide oxidoreductase. Other names in common use include TPNH peroxidase, NADP peroxidase, nicotinamide adenine dinucleotide phosphate peroxidase, TPN peroxidase, triphosphopyridine nucleotide peroxidase, and NADPH2 peroxidase.
