= CoA-disulfide reductase =

Enzyme

Identifiers
- EC no.: 1.8.1.14
- CAS no.: 206770-55-0

Databases
- IntEnz: IntEnz view
- BRENDA: BRENDA entry
- ExPASy: NiceZyme view
- KEGG: KEGG entry
- MetaCyc: metabolic pathway
- PRIAM: profile
- PDB structures: RCSB PDB PDBe PDBsum
- Gene Ontology: AmiGO / QuickGO
Search
- PMC: articles
- PubMed: articles
- NCBI: proteins

In enzymology, a CoA-disulfide reductase (EC 1.8.1.14) is an enzyme that catalyzes the chemical reaction

2 CoA + NAD(P)+ $\rightleftharpoons$ CoA-disulfide + NAD(P)H + H^{+}

The 3 substrates of this enzyme are CoA, NAD^{+}, and NADP^{+}, whereas its 4 products are CoA-disulfide, NADH, NADPH, and H^{+}.

This enzyme belongs to the family of oxidoreductases, specifically those acting on a sulfur group of donors with NAD+ or NADP+ as acceptor. The systematic name of this enzyme class is CoA:NAD(P)+ oxidoreductase. Other names in common use include CoA-disulfide reductase (NADH2), NADH2:CoA-disulfide oxidoreductase, CoA:NAD+ oxidoreductase, CoADR, and coenzyme A disulfide reductase.
