= L-glycol dehydrogenase =

Identifiers
- EC no.: 1.1.1.185
- CAS no.: 77967-75-0

Databases
- IntEnz: IntEnz view
- BRENDA: BRENDA entry
- ExPASy: NiceZyme view
- KEGG: KEGG entry
- MetaCyc: metabolic pathway
- PRIAM: profile
- PDB structures: RCSB PDB PDBe PDBsum
- Gene Ontology: AmiGO / QuickGO
Search
- PMC: articles
- PubMed: articles
- NCBI: proteins

In enzymology, a L-glycol dehydrogenase (EC 1.1.1.185) is an enzyme that catalyzes the chemical reaction

an L-glycol + NAD(P)^{+} $\rightleftharpoons$ a 2-hydroxycarbonyl compound + NAD(P)H + H^{+}

The 3 substrates of this enzyme are L-glycol, NAD^{+}, and NADP^{+}, whereas its 4 products are 2-hydroxycarbonyl compound, NADH, NADPH, and H^{+}.

This enzyme belongs to the family of oxidoreductases, specifically those acting on the CH-OH group of donor with NAD^{+} or NADP^{+} as acceptor. The systematic name of this enzyme class is L-glycol:NAD(P)^{+} oxidoreductase. Other names in common use include glycol (nicotinamide adenine dinucleotide (phosphate)), dehydrogenase, L-(+)-glycol:NAD(P)^{+} oxidoreductase, and L-glycol:NAD(P)^{+} dehydrogenase.
