= 5-carboxymethyl-2-hydroxymuconic-semialdehyde dehydrogenase =

InterPro Family

Identifiers
- EC no.: 1.2.1.60

Databases
- IntEnz: IntEnz view
- BRENDA: BRENDA entry
- ExPASy: NiceZyme view
- KEGG: KEGG entry
- MetaCyc: metabolic pathway
- PRIAM: profile
- PDB structures: RCSB PDB PDBe PDBsum
- Gene Ontology: AmiGO / QuickGO
Search
- PMC: articles
- PubMed: articles
- NCBI: proteins

In enzymology, a 5-carboxymethyl-2-hydroxymuconic-semialdehyde dehydrogenase (EC 1.2.1.60) is an enzyme that catalyzes the chemical reaction

5-carboxymethyl-2-hydroxymuconate semialdehyde + H_{2}O + NAD^{+} $\rightleftharpoons$ 5-carboxymethyl-2-hydroxymuconate + NADH + 2 H^{+}

The 3 substrates of this enzyme are 5-carboxymethyl-2-hydroxymuconate semialdehyde, H_{2}O, and NAD^{+}, whereas its 3 products are 5-carboxymethyl-2-hydroxymuconate, NADH, and H^{+}.

This enzyme belongs to the family of oxidoreductases, specifically those acting on the aldehyde or oxo group of donor with NAD+ or NADP+ as acceptor. The systematic name of this enzyme class is 5-carboxymethyl-2-hydroxymuconic-semialdehyde:NAD+ oxidoreductase. This enzyme is also called carboxymethylhydroxymuconic semialdehyde dehydrogenase. This enzyme participates in tyrosine metabolism.

== Structural studies ==
As of late 2007, only one structure has been solved for this class of enzymes, with the PDB accession code 2D4E.
