= 5,6-dihydroxy-3-methyl-2-oxo-1,2,5,6-tetrahydroquinoline dehydrogenase =

Class of enzymes

Identifiers
- EC no.: 1.3.1.65

Databases
- IntEnz: IntEnz view
- BRENDA: BRENDA entry
- ExPASy: NiceZyme view
- KEGG: KEGG entry
- MetaCyc: metabolic pathway
- PRIAM: profile
- PDB structures: RCSB PDB PDBe PDBsum
- Gene Ontology: AmiGO / QuickGO
Search
- PMC: articles
- PubMed: articles
- NCBI: proteins

In enzymology, a 5,6-dihydroxy-3-methyl-2-oxo-1,2,5,6-tetrahydroquinoline dehydrogenase (EC 1.3.1.65) is an enzyme that catalyzes the chemical reaction

5,6-dihydroxy-3-methyl-2-oxo-1,2,5,6-tetrahydroquinoline + NAD^{+} $\rightleftharpoons$ 5,6-dihydroxy-3-methyl-2-oxo-1,2-dihydroquinoline + NADH + H^{+}

Thus, the two substrates of this enzyme are 5,6-dihydroxy-3-methyl-2-oxo-1,2,5,6-tetrahydroquinoline and NAD^{+}, whereas its 3 products are 5,6-dihydroxy-3-methyl-2-oxo-1,2-dihydroquinoline, NADH, and H^{+}.

This enzyme belongs to the family of oxidoreductases, specifically those acting on the CH-CH group of donor with NAD+ or NADP+ as acceptor. The systematic name of this enzyme class is 5,6-dihydroxy-3-methyl-2-oxo-1,2,5,6-tetrahydroquinoline:NAD+ oxidoreductase.
