= Nitroquinoline-N-oxide reductase =

Class of enzymes

nitroquinoline-N-oxide reductase

Identifiers
- EC no.: 1.7.1.9
- CAS no.: 37256-35-2

Databases
- IntEnz: IntEnz view
- BRENDA: BRENDA entry
- ExPASy: NiceZyme view
- KEGG: KEGG entry
- MetaCyc: metabolic pathway
- PRIAM: profile
- PDB structures: RCSB PDB PDBe PDBsum
- Gene Ontology: AmiGO / QuickGO
Search
- PMC: articles
- PubMed: articles
- NCBI: proteins

In enzymology, a nitroquinoline-N-oxide reductase (EC 1.7.1.9) is an enzyme that catalyzes the chemical reaction

4-(hydroxyamino)quinoline N-oxide + 2 NAD(P)+ + H_{2}O $\rightleftharpoons$ 4-nitroquinoline N-oxide + 2 NAD(P)H + 2 H^{+}

The 4 substrates of this enzyme are 4-hydroxyaminoquinoline N-oxide, NAD^{+}, NADP^{+}, and H_{2}O, whereas its 4 products are 4-nitroquinoline N-oxide, NADH, NADPH, and H^{+}.

This enzyme belongs to the family of oxidoreductases, specifically those acting on other nitrogenous compounds as donors with NAD+ or NADP+ as acceptor. The systematic name of this enzyme class is 4-(hydroxyamino)quinoline N-oxide:NADP+ oxidoreductase. Other names in common use include 4-nitroquinoline 1-oxide reductase, 4NQO reductase, and NAD(P)H2:4-nitroquinoline-N-oxide oxidoreductase.
