= 2-hydroxyquinoline 5,6-dioxygenase =

Class of enzymes

Identifiers
- EC no.: 1.14.12.16
- CAS no.: 172399-50-7

Databases
- IntEnz: IntEnz view
- BRENDA: BRENDA entry
- ExPASy: NiceZyme view
- KEGG: KEGG entry
- MetaCyc: metabolic pathway
- PRIAM: profile
- PDB structures: RCSB PDB PDBe PDBsum
- Gene Ontology: AmiGO / QuickGO
Search
- PMC: articles
- PubMed: articles
- NCBI: proteins

In enzymology, a 2-hydroxyquinoline 5,6-dioxygenase (EC 1.14.12.16) is an enzyme that catalyzes the chemical reaction

quinolin-2-ol + NADH + H^{+} + O_{2} $\rightleftharpoons$ 2,5,6-trihydroxy-5,6-dihydroquinoline + NAD^{+}

The 4 substrates of this enzyme are quinolin-2-ol, NADH, H^{+}, and O_{2}, whereas its two products are 2,5,6-trihydroxy-5,6-dihydroquinoline and NAD^{+}.

This enzyme belongs to the family of oxidoreductases, specifically those acting on paired donors, with O2 as oxidant and incorporation or reduction of oxygen. The oxygen incorporated need not be derived from O2 with NADH or NADPH as one donor, and incorporation of two atoms o oxygen into the other donor. The systematic name of this enzyme class is quinolin-2-ol,NADH:oxygen oxidoreductase (5,6-hydroxylating). Other names in common use include 2-oxo-1,2-dihydroquinoline 5,6-dioxygenase, quinolin-2-ol 5,6-dioxygenase, and quinolin-2(1H)-one 5,6-dioxygenase.
