= Anhydrotetracycline monooxygenase =

Class of enzymes

anhydrotetracycline monooxygenase

Identifiers
- EC no.: 1.14.13.38
- CAS no.: 70766-62-0

Databases
- IntEnz: IntEnz view
- BRENDA: BRENDA entry
- ExPASy: NiceZyme view
- KEGG: KEGG entry
- MetaCyc: metabolic pathway
- PRIAM: profile
- PDB structures: RCSB PDB PDBe PDBsum
- Gene Ontology: AmiGO / QuickGO
Search
- PMC: articles
- PubMed: articles
- NCBI: proteins

In enzymology, an anhydrotetracycline monooxygenase (EC 1.14.13.38) is an enzyme that catalyzes the chemical reaction

anhydrotetracycline + NADPH + H^{+} + O_{2} $\rightleftharpoons$ 12-dehydrotetracycline + NADP^{+} + H_{2}O

The 4 substrates of this enzyme are anhydrotetracycline, NADPH, H^{+}, and O_{2}, whereas its 3 products are 12-dehydrotetracycline, NADP^{+}, and H_{2}O.

This enzyme belongs to the family of oxidoreductases, specifically those acting on paired donors, with O2 as oxidant and incorporation or reduction of oxygen. The oxygen incorporated need not be derived from O2 with NADH or NADPH as one donor, and incorporation of one atom o oxygen into the other donor. The systematic name of this enzyme class is anhydrotetracycline,NADPH:oxygen oxidoreductase (6-hydroxylating). Other names in common use include ATC oxygenase, and anhydrotetracycline oxygenase. This enzyme participates in tetracycline biosynthesis and biosynthesis of type ii polyketide products.
