= Copper(II) hexafluoroantimonate =

Identifiers
| CAS Number | 819869-34-6 |
| 3D model (JSmol) | Interactive image |
| ChemSpider | 13783318 |
| PubChem CID | 16688203 |
- InChI: InChI=1S/Cu.12FH.2Sb/h;12*1H;;/q+2;;;;;;;;;;;;;2*+5/p-12 Key: QROFREBHJJWTIN-UHFFFAOYSA-B
- SMILES: F[Sb-](F)(F)(F)(F)F.F[Sb-](F)(F)(F)(F)F.[Cu+2]

Properties
| Chemical formula | Cu(SbF_{6})_{2} |
| Molar mass | 535.047 g·mol^{−1} |
| Appearance | white solid |
| Melting point | 210 °C (410 °F; 483 K) (decomposes) |

Related compounds
| Other anions | Copper(II) perchlorate |
| Other cations | Ammonium hexafluoroantimonate; Lithium hexafluoroantimonate; Sodium hexafluoroantimonate; Potassium hexafluoroantimonate |
| Related compounds | Fluoroantimonic acid |
- Except where otherwise noted, data are given for materials in their standard state (at 25 °C [77 °F], 100 kPa). Infobox references

Copper(II) hexafluoroantimonate is an inorganic compound with the chemical formula Cu(SbF_{6})_{2}. It is a white hygroscopic solid.

== Structure ==
X-ray powder diffraction suggests copper(II) hexafluoroantimonate adopts a Ni(SbF_{6})_{2}-type structure.

== Preparation ==
Copper(II) hexafluoroantimonate can be prepared by treating copper(II) fluoride with an excess of antimony pentafluoride in anhydrous hydrogen fluoride.

The hexahydrate can be crystallized from acetone and dried over phosphorus pentoxide.

== Use ==
Copper(II) hexafluoroantimonate and related complexes can be used as catalysts in enantioselective conjugate additions, epoxidations, Diels-Alder reactions, asymmetric Henry reactions, and Mukaiyama-Michael reactions. It also catalyzes cycloaddition and ring formation reactions.

== Related compounds ==
Copper(II) salts of other hexafluoride anions such as copper(II) hexafluororuthenate (Cu(RuF_{6})_{2}) have been characterized.

=== Copper(I) hexafluoroantimonate ===
Copper(I) hexafluoroantimonate forms yellow–orange, rhombohedral LiSbF_{6}-type crystals (space group R3̅ (No. 148), a = 530.4 pm, c = 1453 pm, Z = 3). It is prepared by the reduction of copper(II) hexafluoroantimonate with copper in anhydrous hydrogen fluoride.
