= 2-hydroxy-6-oxo-6-phenylhexa-2,4-dienoate reductase =

Class of enzymes

Identifiers
- EC no.: 1.3.1.40
- CAS no.: 104645-83-2

Databases
- IntEnz: IntEnz view
- BRENDA: BRENDA entry
- ExPASy: NiceZyme view
- KEGG: KEGG entry
- MetaCyc: metabolic pathway
- PRIAM: profile
- PDB structures: RCSB PDB PDBe PDBsum
- Gene Ontology: AmiGO / QuickGO
Search
- PMC: articles
- PubMed: articles
- NCBI: proteins

In enzymology, a 2-hydroxy-6-oxo-6-phenylhexa-2,4-dienoate reductase (EC 1.3.1.40) is an enzyme that catalyzes the chemical reaction

2,6-dioxo-6-phenylhexanoate + NADP^{+} $\rightleftharpoons$ 2-hydroxy-6-oxo-6-phenylhexa-2,4-dienoate + NADPH + H^{+}

Thus, the two substrates of this enzyme are 2,6-dioxo-6-phenylhexanoate and NADP^{+}, whereas its 3 products are 2-hydroxy-6-oxo-6-phenylhexa-2,4-dienoate, NADPH, and H^{+}.

This enzyme belongs to the family of oxidoreductases, specifically those acting on the CH-CH group of donor with NAD+ or NADP+ as acceptor. The systematic name of this enzyme class is 2,6-dioxo-6-phenylhexanoate:NADP+ Delta2-oxidoreductase. Other names in common use include 2-hydroxy-6-oxo-phenylhexa-2,4-dienoate (reduced nicotinamide, and adenine dinucleotide phosphate) reductase.
