= 2-(R)-hydroxypropyl-CoM dehydrogenase =

Class of enzymes

Identifiers
- EC no.: 1.1.1.268

Databases
- IntEnz: IntEnz view
- BRENDA: BRENDA entry
- ExPASy: NiceZyme view
- KEGG: KEGG entry
- MetaCyc: metabolic pathway
- PRIAM: profile
- PDB structures: RCSB PDB PDBe PDBsum
- Gene Ontology: AmiGO / QuickGO
Search
- PMC: articles
- PubMed: articles
- NCBI: proteins

In enzymology, a 2-(R)-hydroxypropyl-CoM dehydrogenase (EC 1.1.1.268) is an enzyme that catalyzes the chemical reaction

2-(R)-hydroxypropyl-CoM + NAD^{+} $\rightleftharpoons$ 2-oxopropyl-CoM + NADH + H^{+}

Thus, the two substrates of this enzyme are 2-(R)-hydroxypropyl-CoM and NAD^{+}, whereas its 3 products are 2-oxopropyl-CoM, NADH, and H^{+}.

This enzyme belongs to the family of oxidoreductases, specifically those acting on the CH-OH group of donor with NAD^{+} or NADP^{+} as acceptor. The systematic name of this enzyme class is 2-[2-(R)-hydroxypropylthio]ethanesulfonate:NAD^{+} oxidoreductase. This enzyme is also called 2-(2-(R)-hydroxypropylthio)ethanesulfonate dehydrogenase.

== Structural studies ==
As of late 2007, only one structure has been solved for this class of enzymes, with the PDB accession code 2CFC.
