= DTDP-4-dehydro-6-deoxyglucose reductase =

Class of enzymes

dTDP-4-dehydro-6-deoxyglucose reductase

Identifiers
- EC no.: 1.1.1.266

Databases
- BRENDA: enzyme data
- ExPASy: NiceZyme view
- KEGG: enzyme entry
- MetaCyc: metabolic pathway
- Rhea: reactions
- PDB structures: RCSB PDB PDBe PDBsum
- Gene Ontology: AmiGO / QuickGO
Search
- PMC: articles
- PubMed: articles
- NCBI: proteins

In enzymology, a dTDP-4-dehydro-6-deoxyglucose reductase (EC 1.1.1.266) is an enzyme that catalyzes the chemical reaction

dTDP-D-fucose + NADP^{+} $\rightleftharpoons$ dTDP-4-dehydro-6-deoxy-D-glucose + NADPH + H^{+}

Thus, the two substrates of this enzyme are dTDP-D-fucose and NADP^{+}, whereas its 3 products are dTDP-4-dehydro-6-deoxy-D-glucose, NADPH, and H^{+}.

This enzyme belongs to the family of oxidoreductases, specifically those acting on the CH-OH group of donor with NAD^{+} or NADP^{+} as acceptor. The systematic name of this enzyme class is dTDP-D-fucose:NADP^{+} oxidoreductase. This enzyme is also called dTDP-4-keto-6-deoxyglucose reductase. This enzyme participates in polyketide sugar unit biosynthesis.
