= Nitrosonium hexafluoroantimonate =

Names
- IUPAC name azanylidyneoxidanium;hexafluoroantimony(1-)
- Systematic IUPAC name nitrosonium hexafluoroantimonate

Identifiers
CAS Number	16941-06-3
3D model (JSmol)	Interactive image
ChemSpider	13599996
ECHA InfoCard	100.155.209
EC Number	626-847-1
PubChem CID	16717643
CompTox Dashboard (EPA)	DTXSID00587321
- InChI: InChI=1S/6FH.NO.Sb/c;;;;;;1-2;/h6*1H;;/q;;;;;;+1;+5/p-6 Key: AMGJCGWYCZRXHS-UHFFFAOYSA-H
- SMILES: N#[O+].F[Sb-](F)(F)(F)(F)F

Properties
Chemical formula	F_{6}NOSb
Molar mass	265.756 g·mol^{−1}

Structure
Crystal structure	cubic (150 K)
Space group	Ia3̅
Lattice constant	a = 10.0878 Å α = 90°, β = 90°, γ = 90°
Lattice volume (V)	1026.59 Å^{3}
Formula units (Z)	8 units per cell

Hazards
- GHS labelling
Pictograms	(GHS07: Exclamation mark) (GHS09: Environmental hazard)
Signal word	Warning
Hazard statements	H302, H332, H411
Precautionary statements	P261, P264, P270, P271, P273, P301+P317, P304+P340, P317, P330, P391, P501

Related compounds
Other anions	Nitrosonium hexafluorouranate
- Except where otherwise noted, data are given for materials in their standard state (at 25 °C [77 °F], 100 kPa). Infobox references

Nitrosonium hexafluoroantimonate is an inorganic compound with the chemical formula NOF_{6}Sb, composed of the nitrosonium cation [NO]^{+} and hexafluoroantimonate anion [SbF_{6}]^{-}. The decomposition of this substance releases hydrogen fluoride, nitrogen oxides, and antimony oxides.

== Uses ==
Nitrosonium hexafluoroantimonate is used as an oxidizing agent in organic synthesis.

== Reactions ==
Nitrosonium hexafluoroantimonate forms mixed-cation salts with other hexafluoroantimonates in liquid anhydrous hydrogen fluoride. For example, when combined with copper(II) hexafluoroantimonate, it forms copper(II) nitrosohexafluoroantimonate:

NOSbF_{6} + Cu(SbF_{6})_{2} → NOCu(SbF_{6})_{3}
