= CDP-4-dehydro-6-deoxyglucose reductase =

Identifiers
- EC no.: 1.17.1.1
- CAS no.: 37256-87-4

Databases
- IntEnz: IntEnz view
- BRENDA: BRENDA entry
- ExPASy: NiceZyme view
- KEGG: KEGG entry
- MetaCyc: metabolic pathway
- PRIAM: profile
- PDB structures: RCSB PDB PDBe PDBsum
- Gene Ontology: AmiGO / QuickGO
Search
- PMC: articles
- PubMed: articles
- NCBI: proteins

CDP-4-dehydro-6-deoxyglucose reductase (EC 1.17.1.1) is an enzyme that catalyzes the chemical reaction

CDP-4-dehydro-3,6-dideoxy-D-glucose + NAD(P)^{+} + H_{2}O $\rightleftharpoons$ CDP-4-dehydro-6-deoxy-D-glucose + NAD(P)H + H^{+}

The 4 substrates of this enzyme are CDP-4-dehydro-3,6-dideoxy-D-glucose, nicotinamide adenine dinucleotide ion, nicotinamide adenine dinucleotide phosphate ion, and water, whereas its 4 products are CDP-4-dehydro-6-deoxy-D-glucose, nicotinamide adenine dinucleotide, nicotinamide adenine dinucleotide phosphate, and hydrogen ion.

This enzyme belongs to the family of oxidoreductases, specifically those acting on CH or CH_{2} groups with NAD^{+} or NADP^{+} as acceptor. The systematic name of this enzyme class is CDP-4-dehydro-3,6-dideoxy-D-glucose:NAD(P)^{+} 3-oxidoreductase. Other names in common use include CDP-4-keto-6-deoxyglucose reductase, cytidine diphospho-4-keto-6-deoxy-D-glucose reductase, cytidine diphosphate 4-keto-6-deoxy-D-glucose-3-dehydrogenase, CDP-4-keto-deoxy-glucose reductase, CDP-4-keto-6-deoxy-D-glucose-3-dehydrogenase system, and NAD(P)H:CDP-4-keto-6-deoxy-D-glucose oxidoreductase. This enzyme participates in starch and sucrose metabolism.
