= Diferric-transferrin reductase =

diferric-transferrin reductase

Identifiers
- EC no.: 1.16.1.2
- CAS no.: 105238-49-1

Databases
- BRENDA: enzyme data
- ExPASy: NiceZyme view
- KEGG: enzyme entry
- MetaCyc: metabolic pathway
- Rhea: reactions
- PDB structures: RCSB PDB PDBe PDBsum
- Gene Ontology: AmiGO / QuickGO
Search
- PMC: articles
- PubMed: articles
- NCBI: proteins

In enzymology, a diferric-transferrin reductase (EC 1.16.1.2) is an enzyme that catalyzes the chemical reaction

transferrin[Fe(II)]2 + NAD^{+} + H^{+} $\rightleftharpoons$ transferrin[Fe(III)]2 + NADH

The 3 substrates of this enzyme are [[transferrin[Fe(II)]2]], NAD^{+}, and H^{+}, whereas its two products are [[transferrin[Fe(III)]2]] and NADH.

This enzyme belongs to the family of oxidoreductases, specifically those oxidizing metal ion with NAD+ or NADP+ as acceptor. The systematic name of this enzyme class is transferrin[Fe(II)]2:NAD+ oxidoreductase. Other names in common use include diferric transferrin reductase, NADH diferric transferrin reductase, and transferrin reductase. This enzyme participates in porphyrin and chlorophyll metabolism.

== Structural studies ==
As of late 2007, only one structure has been solved for this class of enzymes, with the PDB accession code PDB: 1L5T.
