= 1,2-dihydrovomilenine reductase =

Class of enzymes

Identifiers
- EC no.: 1.3.1.73

Databases
- IntEnz: IntEnz view
- BRENDA: BRENDA entry
- ExPASy: NiceZyme view
- KEGG: KEGG entry
- MetaCyc: metabolic pathway
- PRIAM: profile
- PDB structures: RCSB PDB PDBe PDBsum
- Gene Ontology: AmiGO / QuickGO
Search
- PMC: articles
- PubMed: articles
- NCBI: proteins

In enzymology, a 1,2-dihydrovomilenine reductase (EC 1.3.1.73) is an enzyme that catalyzes the chemical reaction

17-O-acetylnorajmaline + NADP^{+} $\rightleftharpoons$ 1,2-dihydrovomilenine + NADPH + H^{+}

Thus, the two substrates of this enzyme are 17-O-acetylnorajmaline and NADP^{+}, whereas its 3 products are 1,2-dihydrovomilenine, NADPH, and H^{+}.

This enzyme belongs to the family of oxidoreductases, specifically those acting on the CH-CH group of donor with NAD+ or NADP+ as acceptor. The systematic name of this enzyme class is 17-O-acetylnorajmaline:NADP+ oxidoreductase. This enzyme participates in indole and ipecac alkaloid biosynthesis.
