= Pimeloyl-CoA dehydrogenase =

Class of enzymes

pimeloyl-CoA dehydrogenase

Identifiers
- EC no.: 1.3.1.62

Databases
- IntEnz: IntEnz view
- BRENDA: BRENDA entry
- ExPASy: NiceZyme view
- KEGG: KEGG entry
- MetaCyc: metabolic pathway
- PRIAM: profile
- PDB structures: RCSB PDB PDBe PDBsum
- Gene Ontology: AmiGO / QuickGO
Search
- PMC: articles
- PubMed: articles
- NCBI: proteins

In enzymology, a pimeloyl-CoA dehydrogenase (EC 1.3.1.62) is an enzyme that catalyzes the chemical reaction

pimeloyl-CoA + NAD^{+} $\rightleftharpoons$ 6-carboxyhex-2-enoyl-CoA + NADH + H^{+}

Thus, the two substrates of this enzyme are pimeloyl-CoA and NAD^{+}, whereas its 3 products are 6-carboxyhex-2-enoyl-CoA, NADH, and H^{+}.

This enzyme belongs to the family of oxidoreductases, specifically those acting on the CH-CH group of donor with NAD+ or NADP+ as acceptor. The systematic name of this enzyme class is pimeloyl-CoA:NAD+ oxidoreductase. This enzyme participates in benzoate degradation via coa ligation.
