= Nitrosonium hexafluorouranate =

Properties
Chemical formula	F_{6}NOU
Molar mass	382.025 g·mol^{−1}
Appearance	bluish-green solid
Density	4.4954 g/cm^{3}

Structure
Crystal structure	cubic
Space group	Ia3̅ (No. 206)
Lattice constant	a = 10.3480 Å α = 90°, β = 90°, γ = 90°
Lattice volume (V)	1108.07 Å^{3}
Formula units (Z)	8 units per cell

Related compounds
Other anions	Nitrosonium hexafluoroantimonate
- Except where otherwise noted, data are given for materials in their standard state (at 25 °C [77 °F], 100 kPa). Infobox references

Nitrosonium hexafluorouranate is an inorganic compound with the chemical formula NOUF_{6}, composed of the nitrosonium cation [NO]^{+} and hexafluorouranate anion [UF_{6}]^{-}. It is a bluish-green solid, forming cubic crystals.

== Preparation ==
Nitrosonium hexafluorouranate can be prepared by reacting uranium hexafluoride with nitric oxide or nitrogen dioxide. The reaction can also be performed in anhydrous HF.

== Reactions ==
Nitrosonium hexafluorouranate, when combined with alkali metal nitrates from lithium to cesium (denoted by M), reacts to form the corresponding alkali metal hexafluorouranate along with two nitrogen dioxide molecules.

NOUF_{6}(s) + M NO_{3}(s) M UF_{6}(s) + 2NO_{2}(g)
M = Li − Cs
