= Potassium hexafluoroantimonate =

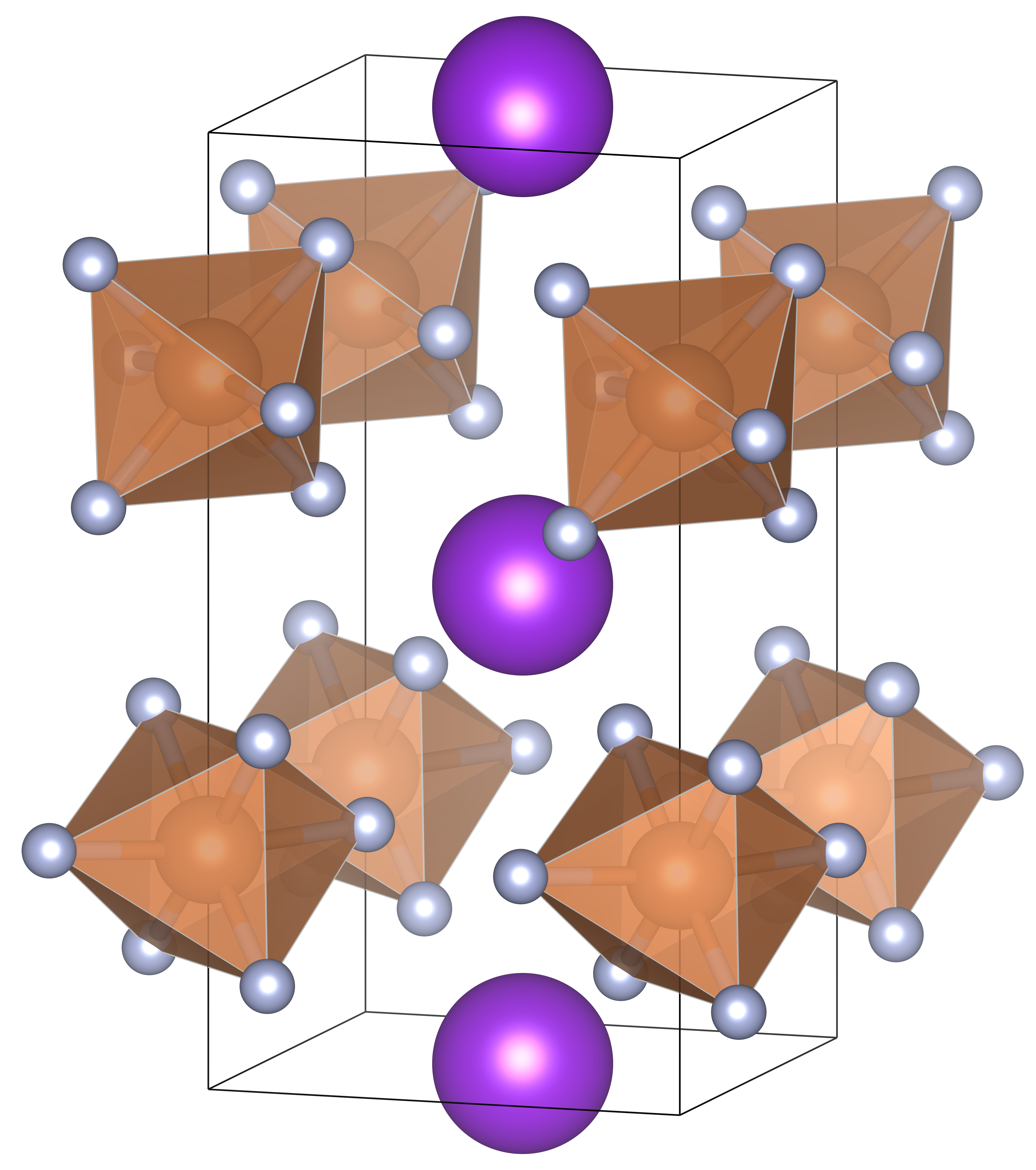

Names
- IUPAC name potassium;hexafluoroantimony(1-)

Identifiers
CAS Number	16893-92-8
3D model (JSmol)	Interactive image
ChemSpider	10814363
ECHA InfoCard	100.156.339
EC Number	628-032-6
PubChem CID	16688490
CompTox Dashboard (EPA)	DTXSID30586923
- InChI: InChI=1S/6FH.K.Sb/h6*1H;;/q;;;;;;+1;+5/p-6 Key: LQKKGPUEJBHVHZ-UHFFFAOYSA-H
- SMILES: [K+].F[Sb-](F)(F)(F)(F)F

Properties
Chemical formula	F_{6}KSb
Molar mass	274.849 g·mol^{−1}
Appearance	powder
Melting point	846
Boiling point	1505

Hazards
- GHS labelling
Pictograms	(GHS07: Exclamation mark) (GHS09: Environmental hazard) (GHS08: Health hazard) (GHS06: Toxic) (GHS03: Oxidizing)
Signal word	Danger
Hazard statements	H302, H332, H411
Precautionary statements	P261, P264, P270, P271, P273, P301+P317, P304+P340, P317, P330, P391, P501
- Except where otherwise noted, data are given for materials in their standard state (at 25 °C [77 °F], 100 kPa). Infobox references

Potassium hexafluoroantimonate is an inorganic chemical compound with the chemical formula KSbF_{6}.

== Synthesis ==
Potassium hexafluoroantimonate can be prepared by reacting potassium pyroantimonate K_{2}H_{2}Sb_{2}O_{7} with hydrogen fluoride or by treating the product of the reaction of a mixture of solid antimony(III) oxide and potassium hydroxide with hydrogen peroxide solution (30%) with hydrochloric acid (48%).

Also, the compound can be prepared by reacting antimony pentafluoride and potassium hexafluoromanganate.

SbF_{5} + K_{2}MnF_{6} → 4KSbF_{6} + 2MnF_{3} + F_{2}

== Uses ==
Potassium hexafluoroantimonate is used as a pharmaceutical intermediate.

== Chemical properties ==
Potassium hexafluoroantimonate can cause violent reactions with strong acids and reducing agents.
