= Perchloric acid =

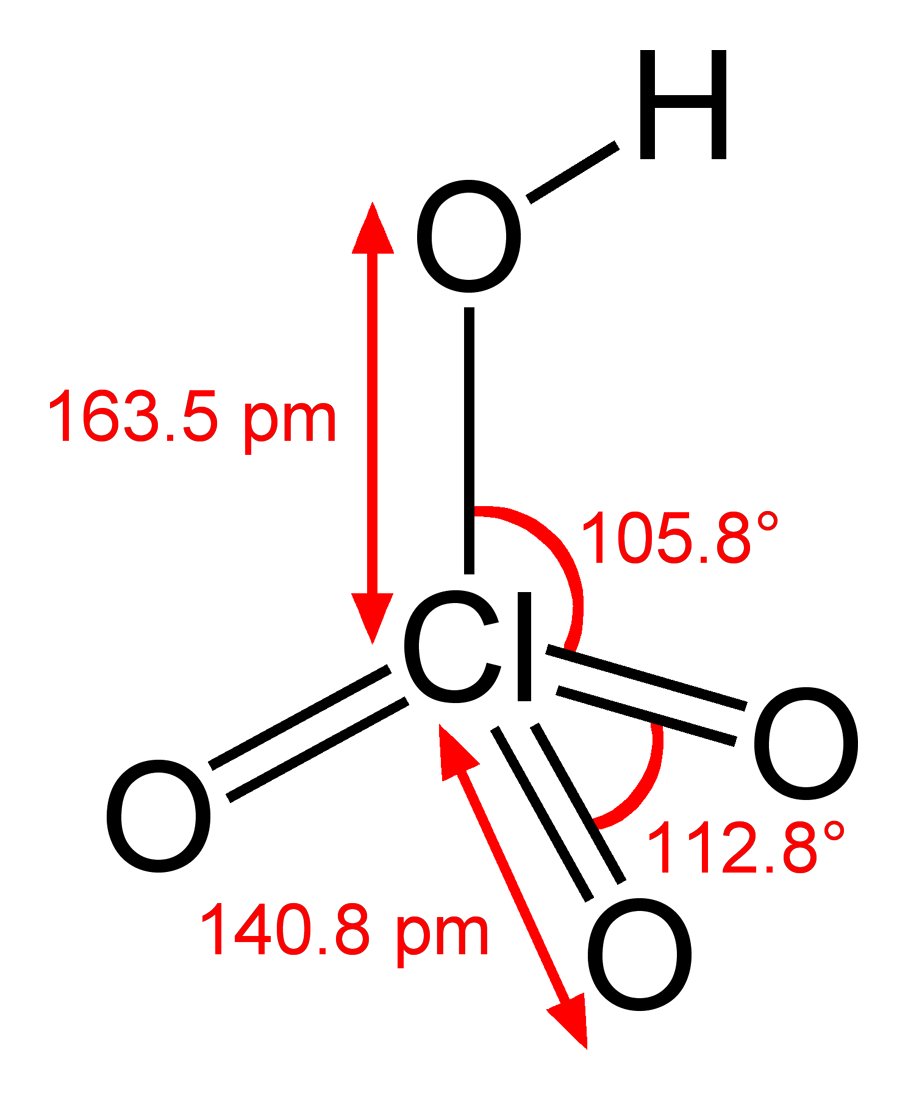
Perchloric acid Hydroxidotrioxidochlorine
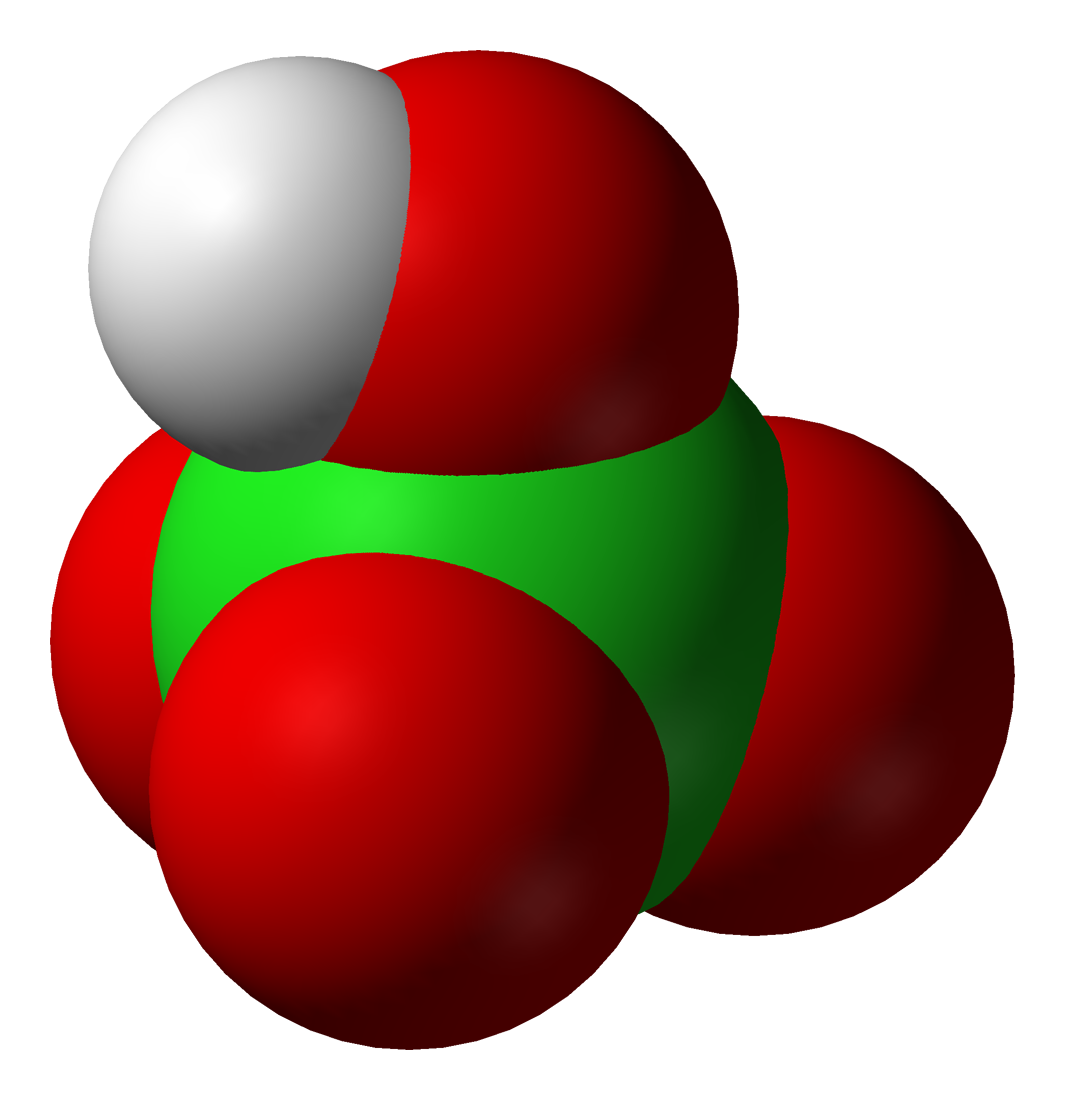
Perchloric acid Hydroxidotrioxidochlorine
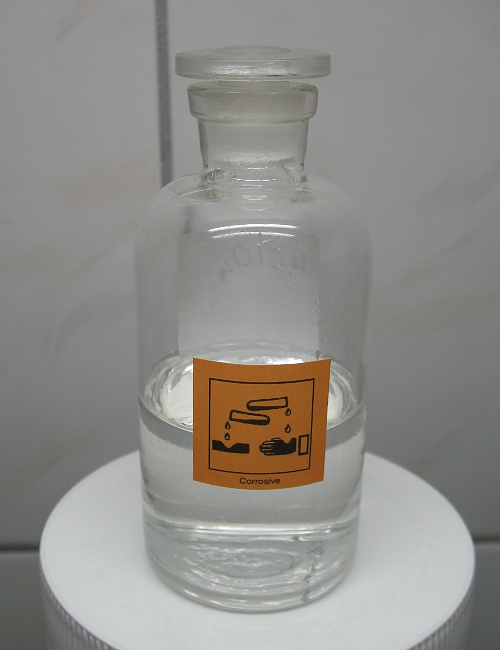
- 60% Perchloric acid

Names
- Systematic IUPAC name Perchloric acid
- Other names Hyperchloric acid

Identifiers
CAS Number	7601-90-3
3D model (JSmol)	Interactive image
ChEBI	CHEBI:29221
ChEMBL	ChEMBL1161634
ChemSpider	22669
ECHA InfoCard	100.028.648
EC Number	231-512-4
PubChem CID	24247
RTECS number	SC7500000
UNII	V561V90BG2
UN number	1873
CompTox Dashboard (EPA)	DTXSID8047004
- InChI: InChI=1S/ClHO4/c2-1(3,4)5/h(H,2,3,4,5) Key: VLTRZXGMWDSKGL-UHFFFAOYSA-N; InChI=1/ClHO4/c2-1(3,4)5/h(H,2,3,4,5) Key: VLTRZXGMWDSKGL-UHFFFAOYAD
- SMILES: O[Cl+3]([O-])([O-])[O-]

Properties
Chemical formula	HClO_{4}
Molar mass	100.45 g·mol^{−1}
Appearance	colorless liquid
Odor	odorless
Density	1.768 g/cm^{3}
Melting point	−17 °C (1 °F; 256 K) (72% aqueous solution) −112 °C (anhydrous)
Boiling point	203 °C (397 °F; 476 K) (azeotrope); 75 °C (anhydrous, decomposition)
Solubility in water	Miscible
Acidity (pK_{a})	−15.2 (±2.0); ≈ −10
Conjugate base	Perchlorate

Hazards
- Occupational safety and health (OHS/OSH)
Main hazards	Powerful oxidizer, highly corrosive, can explosively decompose in high concentrations (or as anhydrous liquid)
- GHS labelling
Pictograms	(GHS03: Oxidizing) (GHS05: Corrosive) (GHS07: Exclamation mark) (GHS08: Health hazard)
Signal word	Danger
Hazard statements	H271, H290, H302, H314, H373
Precautionary statements	P210, P280, P303+P361+P353, P304+P340, P305+P351+P338, P310, P371, P375, P380
NFPA 704 (fire diamond)	3 0 3 OX
Flash point	Non-flammable
Safety data sheet (SDS)	ICSC 1006

Related compounds
Related compounds	Hydronium salt (only some superacids, like perchloric acid can make them): Hydronium perchlorate Other chlorine oxoacids: Hydrochloric acid Hypochlorous acid Chlorous acid Chloric acid Different central atoms: Perbromic acid Periodic acid Permanganic acid Perrhenic acid
- Except where otherwise noted, data are given for materials in their standard state (at 25 °C [77 °F], 100 kPa). verify (what is ?) Infobox references

Perchloric acid is a mineral acid with the formula HClO_{4}. It is an oxoacid of chlorine. Usually found as an aqueous solution, this colorless compound is a stronger acid than sulfuric acid, nitric acid, and hydrochloric acid. It is a powerful oxidizer when hot, but aqueous solutions up to approximately 70% by weight at room temperature are generally safe, only showing strong acid features and no oxidizing properties. Perchloric acid is useful for preparing perchlorate salts, especially ammonium perchlorate, an important rocket fuel component. Perchloric acid is dangerously corrosive and readily forms potentially explosive mixtures.

== History ==
Perchloric acid was first synthesized (together with potassium perchlorate) by Austrian chemist Friedrich von Stadion and called "oxygenated chloric acid" in the mid-1810s. French pharmacist Georges-Simon Serullas introduced the modern designation along with discovering its solid monohydrate, which he mistook for an anhydride. Berzelius produced dilute perchloric acid by electrolysis of chloric acid. In the late 1800s, German and Swedish workers commercialized the electrolysis.

== Production ==
Aqueous perchloric acid is produced industrially by two routes. The traditional method exploits the high aqueous solubility of sodium perchlorate (209 g/100 ml of water at room temperature). Treatment of such solutions with hydrochloric acid gives perchloric acid, precipitating solid sodium chloride:

NaClO_{4} + HCl → NaCl + HClO_{4}

The concentrated acid can be purified by distillation. The alternative route, which is more direct and avoids salts, entails anodic oxidation of aqueous chlorine at a platinum electrode.

In the laboratory for small-scale syntheses, it can be distilled from a solution of potassium perchlorate in sulfuric acid. It can also be synthesized by the treatment of barium perchlorate with sulfuric acid precipitating barium sulfate, leaving perchloric acid. It can also be made by mixing nitric acid with ammonium perchlorate and boiling while adding hydrochloric acid. The reaction gives nitrous oxide and perchloric acid due to a concurrent reaction involving the ammonium ion, and can be concentrated and purified significantly by boiling off the remaining nitric and hydrochloric acids.

Anhydrous perchloric acid is synthesized by the vacuum distillation of a mixture of azeotropic aqueous perchloric acid and oleum (fuming sulfuric acid).

== Properties ==
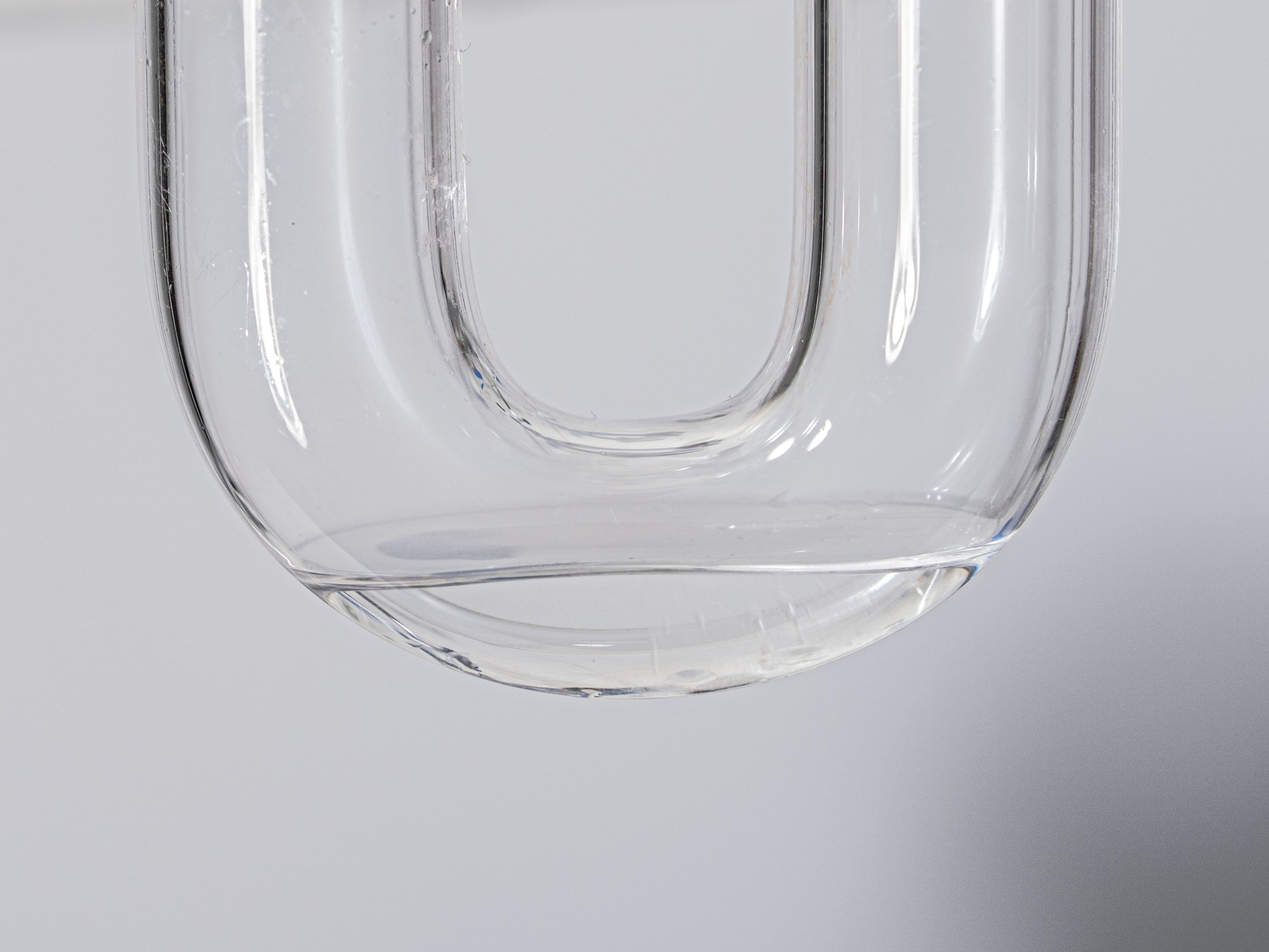
Anhydrous perchloric acid

Anhydrous perchloric acid is an unstable oily liquid at room temperature. It forms at least five hydrates, several of which have been characterized crystallographically. These solids consist of the perchlorate anion linked via hydrogen bonds to H_{2}O and H_{3}O^{+} centers. An example is hydronium perchlorate. Perchloric acid forms an azeotrope with water, consisting of about 72.5% perchloric acid. This form of the acid is stable indefinitely and is commercially available. Such solutions are hygroscopic. Thus, if left open to the air, concentrated perchloric acid dilutes itself by absorbing water from the air.

Dehydration of perchloric acid gives the anhydride dichlorine heptoxide:

2 HClO_{4} + P_{4}O_{10} → Cl_{2}O_{7} + H_{2}P_{4}O_{11}

== Uses ==
Perchloric acid is mainly produced as a precursor to ammonium perchlorate, which is used in rocket propellant. The growth in rocketry has led to increased production of perchloric acid. Several million kilograms are produced annually. Perchloric acid is one of the most proven materials for etching of liquid-crystal displays and critical electronics applications as well as ore extraction and has unique properties in analytical chemistry. Additionally it is a useful component in etching of chromium.

=== As an acid ===
Perchloric acid, a superacid when anhydrous, is one of the strongest Brønsted–Lowry acids. That its pK_{a} is lower than −9 is evidenced by the fact that its monohydrate contains discrete hydronium ions and can be isolated as a stable, crystalline solid, formulated as [H_{3}O^{+}][ClO^{–}_{4}]. The most recent estimate of its aqueous pK_{a} is −15.2±2.0. It provides strong acidity with minimal interference because perchlorate is weakly nucleophilic (explaining the high acidity of HClO_{4}). Other acids of noncoordinating anions, such as fluoroboric acid and hexafluorophosphoric acid are susceptible to hydrolysis, whereas perchloric acid is not. Despite hazards associated with the explosiveness of its salts, the acid is often preferred in certain syntheses. For similar reasons, it is a useful eluent in ion-exchange chromatography. It is also used in electropolishing or the etching of aluminium, molybdenum, and other metals.

In geochemistry, perchloric acid aids in the digestion of silicate mineral samples for analysis, and also for complete digestion of organic matter.

== Safety ==
Given its strong oxidizing properties, perchloric acid is subject to extensive regulations because it can react violently with metals and flammable substances such as wood, plastics, and oils. Work conducted with perchloric acid must be conducted in fume hoods with a wash-down capability to prevent accumulation of oxidisers in the ductwork.

On February 20, 1947 in Los Angeles, California, 17 people were killed and 150 injured in the O'Connor Plating Works disaster. A bath, consisting of over 1000 litres of 75% perchloric acid and 25% acetic anhydride by volume which was being used to electro-polish aluminium furniture, exploded. Organic compounds were added to the overheating bath when an iron rack was replaced with one coated with cellulose acetobutyrate (Tenit-2 plastic). A few minutes later the bath exploded. The O'Connor Electro-Plating plant, 25 other buildings, and 40 automobiles were destroyed, and 250 nearby homes were damaged.

== See also ==
- Chloric acid
- Oxidizing acid
- Transition metal perchlorate complexes
- Sulfuric acid
