= Hydronium =

Aqueous cation H3O+

3D diagram showing the pyramidal structure of the hydroxonium ion
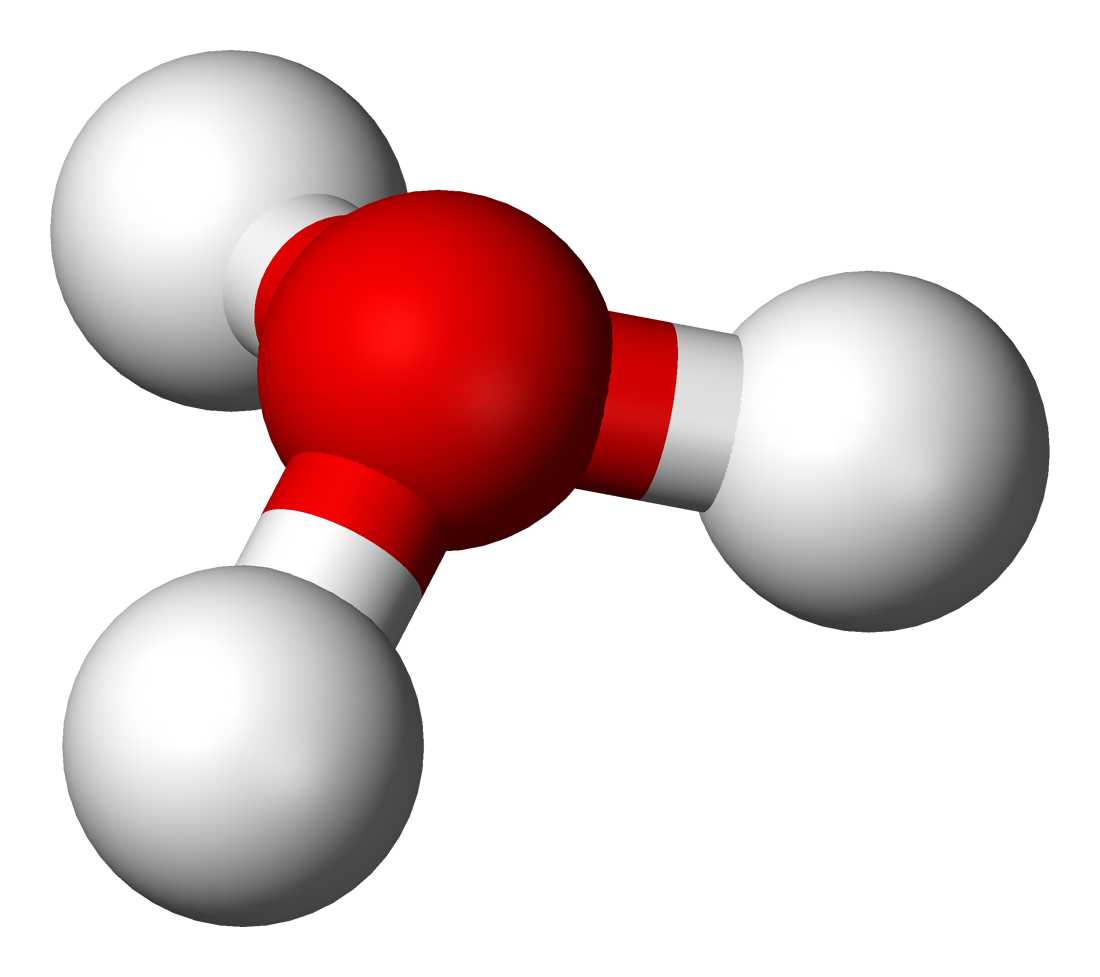
Ball-and-stick model of the hydronium ion
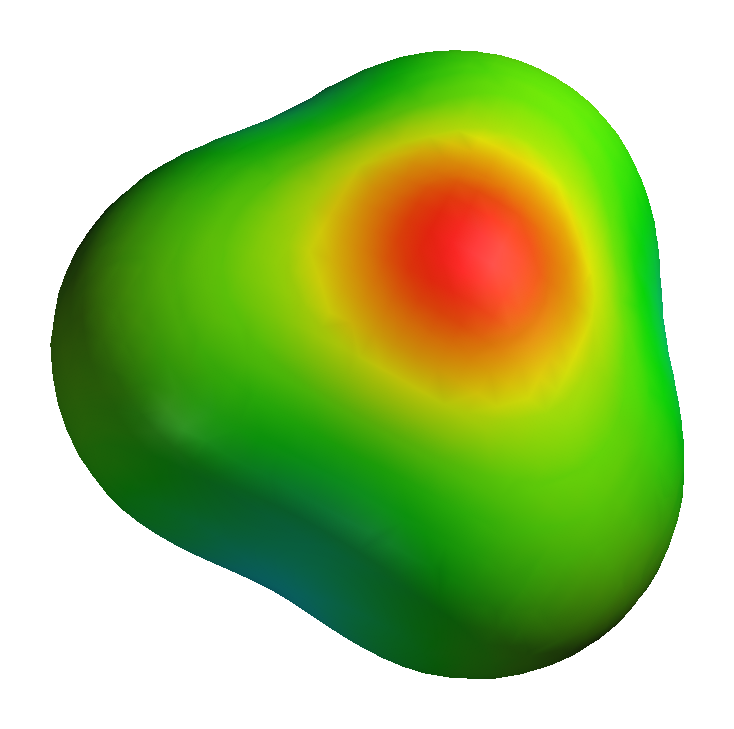
3D electric potential surface of the hydroxonium cation
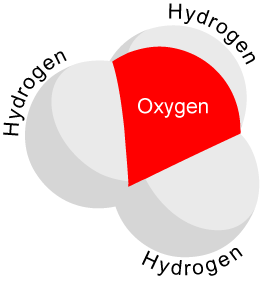
Van der Waals radius of Hydronium

Names
- IUPAC name oxonium
- Other names hydronium ion

Identifiers
CAS Number	13968-08-6
3D model (JSmol)	Interactive image
ChEBI	CHEBI:29412
ChemSpider	109935
Gmelin Reference	141
PubChem CID	123332
CompTox Dashboard (EPA)	DTXSID20893597
- InChI: InChI=1S/H2O/h1H2/p+1 Key: XLYOFNOQVPJJNP-UHFFFAOYSA-O
- SMILES: [OH3+]

Properties
Chemical formula	H_{3}O^{+}
Molar mass	19.023 g·mol^{−1}
Acidity (pK_{a})	undefined
Conjugate base	Water
- Except where otherwise noted, data are given for materials in their standard state (at 25 °C [77 °F], 100 kPa). verify (what is ?) Infobox references

In chemistry, hydronium (hydroxonium in traditional British English) is the cation [H_{3}O]^{+}, also written as H_{3}O^{+}, the type of oxonium ion produced by protonation of water. It is often viewed as the positive ion present when an Arrhenius acid is dissolved in water, as Arrhenius acid molecules in solution give up a proton (a positive hydrogen ion, H^{+}) to the surrounding water molecules (H_{2}O). In fact, acids must be surrounded by more than a single water molecule in order to ionize, yielding aqueous H^{+} and conjugate base.

Three main structures for the aqueous proton have garnered experimental support:

- the Eigen cation, which is a tetrahydrate, H_{3}O^{+}(H_{2}O)_{3}
- the Zundel cation, which is a symmetric dihydrate, H^{+}(H_{2}O)_{2}
- and the Stoyanov cation, an expanded Zundel cation, which is a hexahydrate: H^{+}(H_{2}O)_{2}(H_{2}O)_{4}

Spectroscopic evidence from well-defined IR spectra overwhelmingly supports the Stoyanov cation as the predominant form. For this reason, it has been suggested that wherever possible, the symbol H^{+}(aq) should be used instead of the hydronium ion.

== Relation to pH ==
The molar concentration of hydronium or H^{+} ions determines a solution's pH according to

pH = −log([H_{3}O^{+}]/M)

where M = mol/L. The concentration of hydroxide ions analogously determines a solution's pOH. The molecules in pure water auto-dissociate into aqueous protons and hydroxide ions in the following equilibrium:

H_{2}O ⇌ OH^{−}(aq) + H^{+}(aq)

In pure water, there is an equal number of hydroxide and H^{+} ions, so it is a neutral solution. At 25 °C (77 °F), pure water has a pH of 7 and a pOH of 7 (this varies when the temperature changes: see self-ionization of water). A pH value less than 7 indicates an acidic solution, and a pH value more than 7 indicates a basic solution.

== Nomenclature ==
According to IUPAC nomenclature of organic chemistry, the hydronium ion should be referred to as oxonium. Hydroxonium may also be used unambiguously to identify it.

An oxonium ion is any cation containing a trivalent oxygen atom.

== Structure ==
Since O^{+} and N have the same number of electrons, H_{3}O^{+} is isoelectronic with ammonia. As shown in the images above, H_{3}O^{+} has a trigonal pyramidal molecular geometry with the oxygen atom at its apex. The H−O−H bond angle is approximately 113°, and the center of mass is very close to the oxygen atom. Because the base of the pyramid is made up of three identical hydrogen atoms, the H_{3}O^{+} molecule's symmetric top configuration is such that it belongs to the C_{3v} point group. Because of this symmetry and the fact that it has a dipole moment, the rotational selection rules are ΔJ = ±1 and ΔK = 0. The transition dipole lies along the c-axis and, because the negative charge is localized near the oxygen atom, the dipole moment points to the apex, perpendicular to the base plane.

== Acids and acidity ==
The hydrated proton is very acidic: at 25 °C, its pK_{a} is approximately 0. The values commonly given for pK_{a}^{aq}(H_{3}O^{+}) are 0 or −1.74. The former uses the convention that the activity of the solvent in a dilute solution (in this case, water) is 1, while the latter uses the value of the concentration of water in the pure liquid of 55.5 M. Silverstein has shown that the latter value is thermodynamically unsupportable. The disagreement comes from the ambiguity that to define pK_{a} of H_{3}O^{+} in water, H_{2}O has to act simultaneously as a solute and the solvent. The IUPAC has not given an official definition of pK_{a} that would resolve this ambiguity. Burgot has argued that H_{3}O^{+}(aq) + H_{2}O (l) ⇄ H_{2}O (aq) + H_{3}O^{+} (aq) is simply not a thermodynamically well-defined process. For an estimate of pK_{a}^{aq}(H_{3}O^{+}), Burgot suggests taking the measured value pK_{a}^{EtOH}(H_{3}O^{+}) = 0.3, the pK_{a} of H_{3}O^{+} in ethanol, and applying the correlation equation pK_{a}^{aq} = pK_{a}^{EtOH} − 1.0 (± 0.3) to convert the ethanol pK_{a} to an aqueous value, to give a value of pK_{a}^{aq}(H_{3}O^{+}) = −0.7 (± 0.3). On the other hand, Silverstein has shown that Ballinger and Long's experimental results support a pK_{a} of 0.0 for the aqueous proton. Neils and Schaertel provide added arguments for a pK_{a} of 0.0.

The aqueous proton is the most acidic species that can exist in water (assuming sufficient water for dissolution): any stronger acid will ionize and yield a hydrated proton. The acidity of H^{+}(aq) is the implicit standard used to judge the strength of an acid in water: strong acids must be better proton donors than H^{+}(aq), as otherwise a significant portion of acid will exist in a non-ionized state (i.e.: a weak acid). Unlike H^{+}(aq) in neutral solutions that result from water's autodissociation, in acidic solutions, H^{+}(aq) is long-lasting and concentrated, in proportion to the strength of the dissolved acid.

pH was originally conceived to be a measure of the hydrogen ion concentration of aqueous solution. Virtually all such free protons are quickly hydrated; acidity of an aqueous solution is therefore more accurately characterized by its concentration of H^{+}(aq). In organic syntheses, such as acid catalyzed reactions, the hydronium ion (H_{3}O^{+}) is used interchangeably with the H^{+} ion; choosing one over the other has no significant effect on the mechanism of reaction.

== Solvation ==
Researchers have yet to fully characterize the solvation of hydronium ion in water, in part because many different meanings of solvation exist. A freezing-point depression study determined that the mean hydration ion in cold water is approximately H_{3}O^{+}(H_{2}O)_{6}: on average, each hydronium ion is solvated by 6 water molecules which are unable to solvate other solute molecules.

Some hydration structures are quite large: the H_{3}O^{+}(H_{2}O)_{20} magic ion number structure (called magic number because of its increased stability with respect to hydration structures involving a comparable number of water molecules – this is a similar usage of the term magic number as in nuclear physics) might place the hydronium inside a dodecahedral cage. However, more recent ab initio method molecular dynamics simulations have shown that, on average, the hydrated proton resides on the surface of the H_{3}O^{+}(H_{2}O)_{20} cluster. Further, several disparate features of these simulations agree with their experimental counterparts suggesting an alternative interpretation of the experimental results.

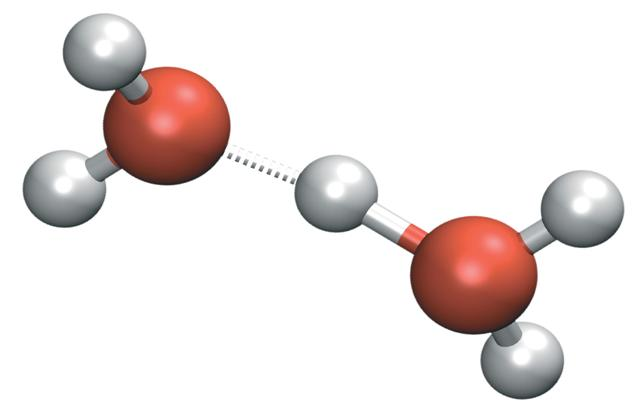
Zundel cation

Two other well-known structures are the Zundel cation and the Eigen cation. The Eigen solvation structure has the hydronium ion at the center of an H_{9}O^{+}_{4} complex in which the hydronium is strongly hydrogen-bonded to three neighbouring water molecules. In the Zundel H_{5}O^{+}_{2} complex the proton is shared equally by two water molecules in a symmetric hydrogen bond. A work in 1999 indicates that both of these complexes represent ideal structures in a more general hydrogen bond network defect.

Isolation of the hydronium ion monomer in liquid phase was achieved in a nonaqueous, low nucleophilicity superacid solution (fluoroantimonic acid dissolved in SO_{2}). The ion was characterized by high resolution ^{17}O nuclear magnetic resonance.

A 2007 calculation of the enthalpies and free energies of the various hydrogen bonds around the hydronium cation in liquid protonated water at room temperature and a study of the proton hopping mechanism using molecular dynamics showed that the hydrogen-bonds around the hydronium ion (formed with the three water ligands in the first solvation shell of the hydronium) are quite strong compared to those of bulk water.

A new model was proposed by Stoyanov based on infrared spectroscopy in which the proton exists as an H_{13}O^{+}_{6} ion. The positive charge is thus delocalized over 6 water molecules.

== Solid hydronium salts ==
For many strong acids, it is possible to form crystals of their hydronium salt that are relatively stable. These salts are sometimes called acid monohydrates. As a rule, any acid with an ionization constant of 10^{9} or higher may do this. Acids whose ionization constants are below 10^{9} generally cannot form stable H_{3}O^{+} salts. For example, nitric acid has an ionization constant of 10^{1.4}, and mixtures with water at all proportions are liquid at room temperature. However, perchloric acid has an ionization constant of 10^{10}, and if liquid anhydrous perchloric acid and water are combined in a 1:1 molar ratio, they react to form solid hydronium perchlorate (H_{3}O^{+}·ClO^{−}_{4}).

The hydronium ion also forms stable compounds with the carborane superacid H(CB_{11}H(CH_{3})_{5}Br_{6}). X-ray crystallography shows a C_{3v} symmetry for the hydronium ion with each proton interacting with a bromine atom each from three carborane anions 320 pm apart on average. The [H_{3}O][H(CB_{11}HCl_{11})] salt is also soluble in benzene. In crystals grown from a benzene solution the solvent co-crystallizes and a H_{3}O·(C_{6}H_{6})_{3} cation is completely separated from the anion. In the cation three benzene molecules surround hydronium forming pi-cation interactions with the hydrogen atoms. The closest (non-bonding) approach of the anion at chlorine to the cation at oxygen is 348 pm.

There are also many known examples of salts containing hydrated hydronium ions, such as the H_{5}O^{+}_{2} ion in HCl·2H_{2}O, the H_{7}O^{+}_{3} and H_{9}O^{+}_{4} ions both found in HBr·4H_{2}O.

Sulfuric acid is also known to form a hydronium salt H_{3}O^{+}HSO^{−}_{4} at temperatures below 8.49 °C (47.28 °F).

== Interstellar H_{3}O^{+} ==
Hydronium is an abundant molecular ion in the interstellar medium and is found in diffuse and dense molecular clouds as well as the plasma tails of comets. Interstellar sources of hydronium observations include the regions of Sagittarius B2, Orion OMC-1, Orion BN–IRc2, Orion KL, and the comet Hale–Bopp.

Interstellar hydronium is formed by a chain of reactions started by the ionization of H_{2} into H^{+}_{2} by cosmic radiation. H_{3}O^{+} can produce either OH^{−} or H_{2}O through dissociative recombination reactions, which occur very quickly even at the low (≥10 K) temperatures of dense clouds. This leads to hydronium playing a very important role in interstellar ion-neutral chemistry.

Astronomers are especially interested in determining the abundance of water in various interstellar climates due to its key role in the cooling of dense molecular gases through radiative processes. However, H_{2}O does not have many favorable transitions for ground-based observations. Although observations of HDO (the deuterated version of water) could potentially be used for estimating H_{2}O abundances, the ratio of HDO to H_{2}O is not known very accurately.

Hydronium, on the other hand, has several transitions that make it a superior candidate for detection and identification in a variety of situations. This information has been used in conjunction with laboratory measurements of the branching ratios of the various H_{3}O^{+} dissociative recombination reactions to provide what are believed to be relatively accurate OH^{−} and H_{2}O abundances without requiring direct observation of these species.

=== Interstellar chemistry ===
As mentioned previously, H_{3}O^{+} is found in both diffuse and dense molecular clouds. By applying the reaction rate constants (α, β, and γ) corresponding to all of the currently available characterized reactions involving H_{3}O^{+}, it is possible to calculate k(T) for each of these reactions. By multiplying these k(T) by the relative abundances of the products, the relative rates (in cm^{3}/s) for each reaction at a given temperature can be determined. These relative rates can be made in absolute rates by multiplying them by the [H_{2}]^{2}. By assuming T = 10 K for a dense cloud and T = 50 K for a diffuse cloud, the results indicate that most dominant formation and destruction mechanisms were the same for both cases. It should be mentioned that the relative abundances used in these calculations correspond to TMC-1, a dense molecular cloud, and that the calculated relative rates are therefore expected to be more accurate at T = 10 K. The three fastest formation and destruction mechanisms are listed in the table below, along with their relative rates. Note that the rates of these six reactions are such that they make up approximately 99% of hydronium ion's chemical interactions under these conditions. All three destruction mechanisms in the table below are classified as dissociative recombination reactions.

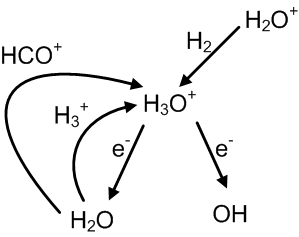
Primary reaction pathways of H_{3}O^{+} in the interstellar medium (specifically, dense clouds).

Reaction	Type	Relative rate (cm^{3}/s)	
Reaction	Type	at 10 K	at 50 K
H_{2} + H_{2}O^{+} → H_{3}O^{+} + H	Formation	2.97×10^{−22}	2.97×10^{−22}
H_{2}O + HCO^{+} → CO + H_{3}O^{+}	Formation	4.52×10^{−23}	4.52×10^{−23}
H^{+}_{3} + H_{2}O → H_{3}O^{+} + H_{2}	Formation	3.75×10^{−23}	3.75×10^{−23}
H_{3}O^{+} + e^{−} → OH + H + H	Destruction	2.27×10^{−22}	1.02×10^{−22}
H_{3}O^{+} + e^{−} → H_{2}O + H	Destruction	9.52×10^{−23}	4.26×10^{−23}
H_{3}O^{+} + e^{−} → OH + H_{2}	Destruction	5.31×10^{−23}	2.37×10^{−23}

It is also worth noting that the relative rates for the formation reactions in the table above are the same for a given reaction at both temperatures. This is due to the reaction rate constants for these reactions having β and γ constants of 0, resulting in k = α which is independent of temperature.

Since all three of these reactions produce either H_{2}O or OH, these results reinforce the strong connection between their relative abundances and that of H_{3}O^{+}. The rates of these six reactions are such that they make up approximately 99% of hydronium ion's chemical interactions under these conditions.

=== Astronomical detections ===
As early as 1973 and before the first interstellar detection, chemical models of the interstellar medium (the first corresponding to a dense cloud) predicted that hydronium was an abundant molecular ion and that it played an important role in ion-neutral chemistry. However, before an astronomical search could be underway there was still the matter of determining hydronium's spectroscopic features in the gas phase, which at this point were unknown. The first studies of these characteristics came in 1977, which was followed by other, higher resolution spectroscopy experiments. Once several lines had been identified in the laboratory, the first interstellar detection of H_{3}O^{+} was made by two groups almost simultaneously in 1986. The first, published in June 1986, reported observation of the J^{vt}_{K} = 1^{−}_{1} − 2^{+}_{1} transition at 307192.41 MHz in OMC-1 and Sgr B2. The second, published in August, reported observation of the same transition toward the Orion-KL nebula.

These first detections have been followed by observations of a number of additional H_{3}O^{+} transitions. The first observations of each subsequent transition detection are given below in chronological order:

In 1991, the 3^{+}_{2} − 2^{−}_{2} transition at 364797.427 MHz was observed in OMC-1 and Sgr B2. One year later, the 3^{+}_{0} − 2^{−}_{0} transition at 396272.412 MHz was observed in several regions, the clearest of which was the W3 IRS 5 cloud.

The first far-IR 4^{−}_{3} − 3^{+}_{3} transition at 69.524 μm (4.3121 THz) was made in 1996 near Orion BN-IRc2. In 2001, three additional transitions of H_{3}O^{+} were observed in the far infrared in Sgr B2; 2^{−}_{1} − 1^{+}_{1} transition at 100.577 μm (2.98073 THz), 1^{−}_{1} − 1^{+}_{1} at 181.054 μm (1.65582 THz) and 2^{−}_{0} − 1^{+}_{0} at 100.869 μm (2.9721 THz).

== See also ==
- Hydron (hydrogen cation)
- Hydride
- Hydrogen anion
- Hydrogen ion
- Grotthus mechanism
- Trifluorooxonium
- Law of dilution
