= Lithium hexafluoroantimonate =

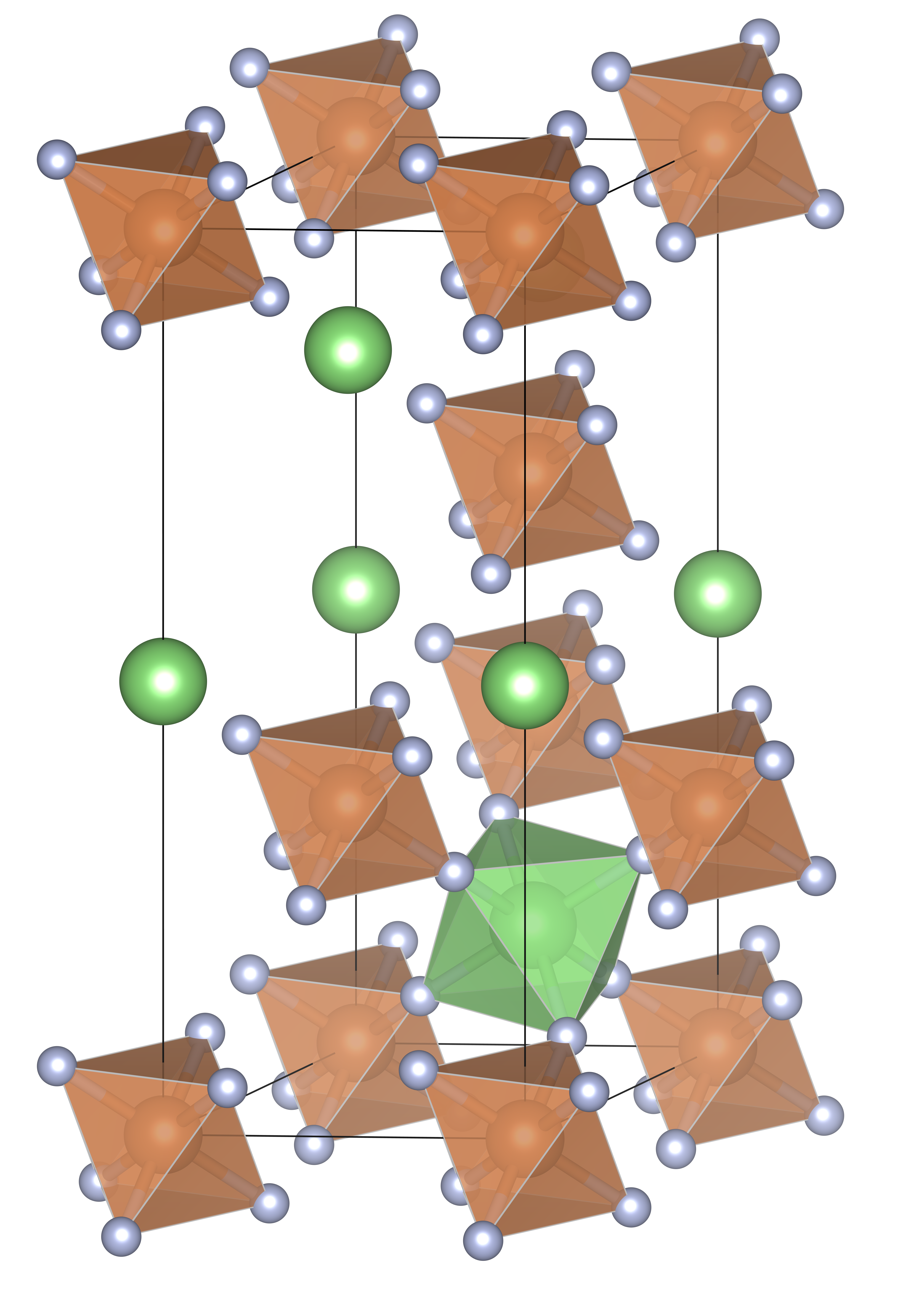

Names
- IUPAC name lithium;hexafluoroantimony(1-)
- Other names Lithium hexafluoroantimonate(V)

Identifiers
CAS Number	18424-17-4
3D model (JSmol)	Interactive image
ChemSpider	16700586
ECHA InfoCard	100.196.093
EC Number	670-363-3
PubChem CID	16700586
CompTox Dashboard (EPA)	DTXSID00587189
- InChI: InChI=1S/6FH.Li.Sb/h6*1H;;/q;;;;;;+1;+5/p-6 Key: YVBBFYDVCPCHHG-UHFFFAOYSA-H
- SMILES: [Li+].F[Sb-](F)(F)(F)(F)F

Properties
Chemical formula	NaSbF_{6}
Appearance	White to off-white powder
Solubility in water	soluble

Hazards
- GHS labelling
Pictograms	(GHS07: Exclamation mark) (GHS09: Environmental hazard)
Signal word	Warning
- Except where otherwise noted, data are given for materials in their standard state (at 25 °C [77 °F], 100 kPa). Infobox references

Lithium hexafluoroantimonate is an inorganic chemical compound with the chemical formula LiSbF_{6}.

== Physical properties ==
The compound crystallizes in the rhombohedral space group R3 with the lattice constants a = 5.43 Å, α = 56° 58', Z = 1. The structure corresponds to that of rhombohedral distorted NaSbF_{6} type.
