= Ammonium hexafluoroantimonate =

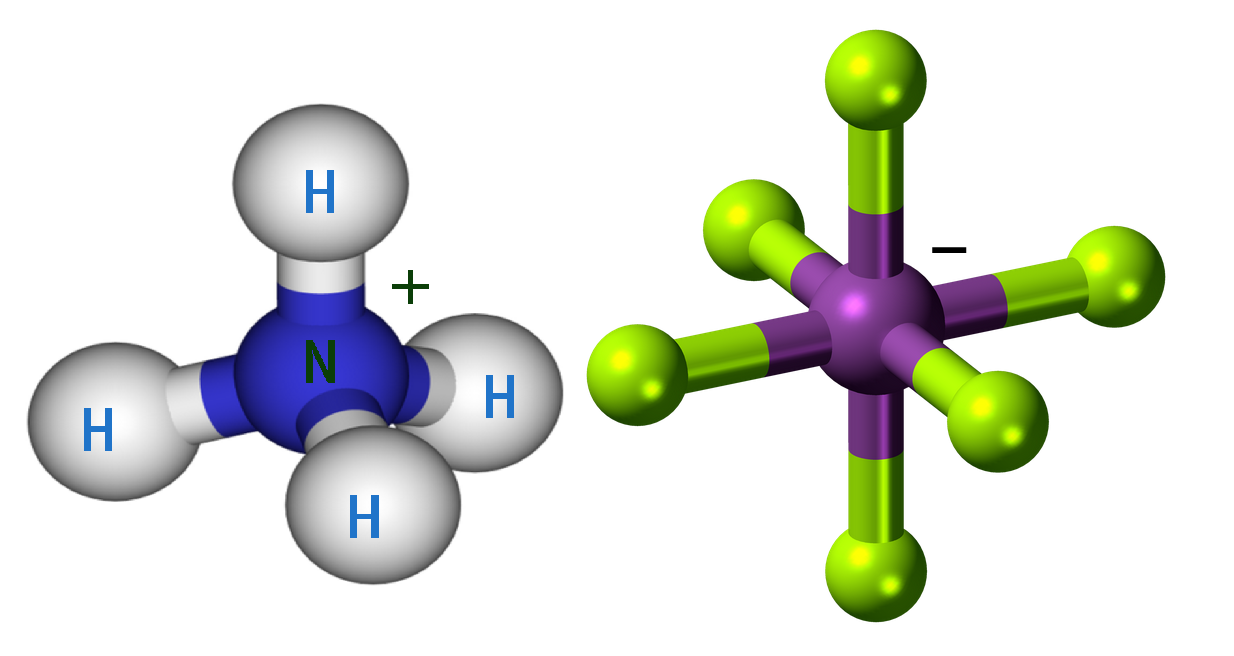

Names
- IUPAC name azanium;hexafluoroantimony(1-)
- Other names Ammonium antimony fluoride

Identifiers
CAS Number	52503-06-7
3D model (JSmol)	Interactive image
PubChem CID	16702435
- InChI: InChI=1S/6FH.H3N.Sb/h6*1H;1H3;/q;;;;;;;+5/p-5 Key: ZPHCPPBIGJXZTF-UHFFFAOYSA-I
- SMILES: [NH4+].F[Sb-](F)(F)(F)(F)F

Properties
Chemical formula	F_{6}H_{4}NSb
Molar mass	253.789 g·mol^{−1}
Appearance	white solid
Solubility in water	soluble

Hazards
- GHS labelling
Pictograms	(GHS02: Flammable) (GHS06: Toxic)
Signal word	Danger
- Except where otherwise noted, data are given for materials in their standard state (at 25 °C [77 °F], 100 kPa). Infobox references

Ammonium hexafluoroantimonate is an inorganic chemical compound with the chemical formula NH_{4}SbF_{6}. It is composed of the ammonium [NH_{4}]^{+} cation and the hexafluoroantimonate [SbF_{6}]^{-} anion.

== Properties ==
It is soluble in water. It can form needle-shaped or columnar crystals.

== Synthesis ==
It is formed from the reaction between antimony pentafluoride and ammonium hexafluoromanganate(IV):

4SbF_{5} + 2(NH_{4})_{2}MnF_{6} → 4 (NH_{4})_{2}SbF_{6} + 2MnF_{3} + F_{2}

== Uses ==
The compound is used in fine chemistry and organic synthesis, for example as a catalyst, and can replace organic fluorides.
