= Sodium hexafluoroantimonate =

Names
- IUPAC name sodium;hexafluoroantimony(1-)

Identifiers
CAS Number	16925-25-0
3D model (JSmol)	Interactive image
ChemSpider	10626272
ECHA InfoCard	100.037.248
EC Number	240-989-8
PubChem CID	16689647
UNII	7JW6105AEM
CompTox Dashboard (EPA)	DTXSID301014504
- InChI: InChI=1S/6FH.Na.Sb/h6*1H;;/q;;;;;;+1;+5/p-6 Key: HKLMYZVMEYYVBS-UHFFFAOYSA-H
- SMILES: F[Sb-](F)(F)(F)(F)F.[Na+]

Properties
Chemical formula	NaSbF_{6}
Appearance	colorless crystals
Solubility in water	soluble (slow hydrolysis)

Hazards
- GHS labelling
Pictograms	(GHS07: Exclamation mark) (GHS09: Environmental hazard) (GHS03: Oxidizing) (GHS06: Toxic) (GHS08: Health hazard)
Signal word	Danger
- Except where otherwise noted, data are given for materials in their standard state (at 25 °C [77 °F], 100 kPa). Infobox references

Sodium hexafluoroantimonate is an inorganic chemical compound with the chemical formula NaSbF_{6}.

== Synthesis ==
Sodium hexafluoroantimonate may be synthesised by oxidation of antimony trioxide with bromine trifluoride:

6Sb_{2}O_{3} + 20BrF_{3} + 12NaF → 12Na[SbF_{6}] + 10Br_{2} + 9O_{2}

Or it may be formed by reaction of antimony and sodium fluorides:

SbF_{5} + NaF → Na[SbF_{6}]

== Physical properties ==
Sodium hexafluoroantimonate forms colorless crystals, soluble in water. It crystallizes in the cubic Pa3 space group with unit cell dimension of a=0.820 Å.

== Chemical properties ==
Sodium hexafluoroantimonate undergoes slow partial hydrolysis in aqueous solutions.
