= Hydronium perchlorate =

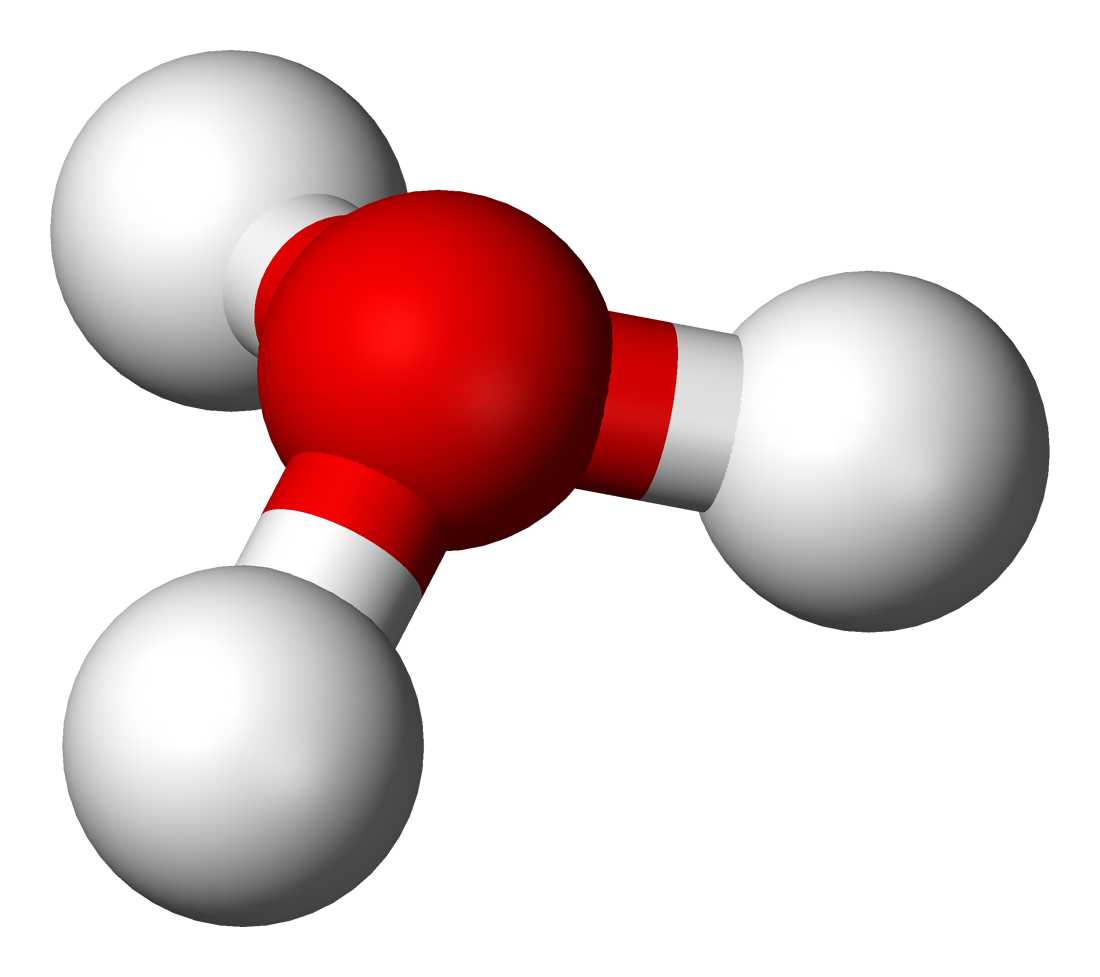
Hydronium cation, [H_{3}O]^{+}
Oxygen, O
Hydrogen, H
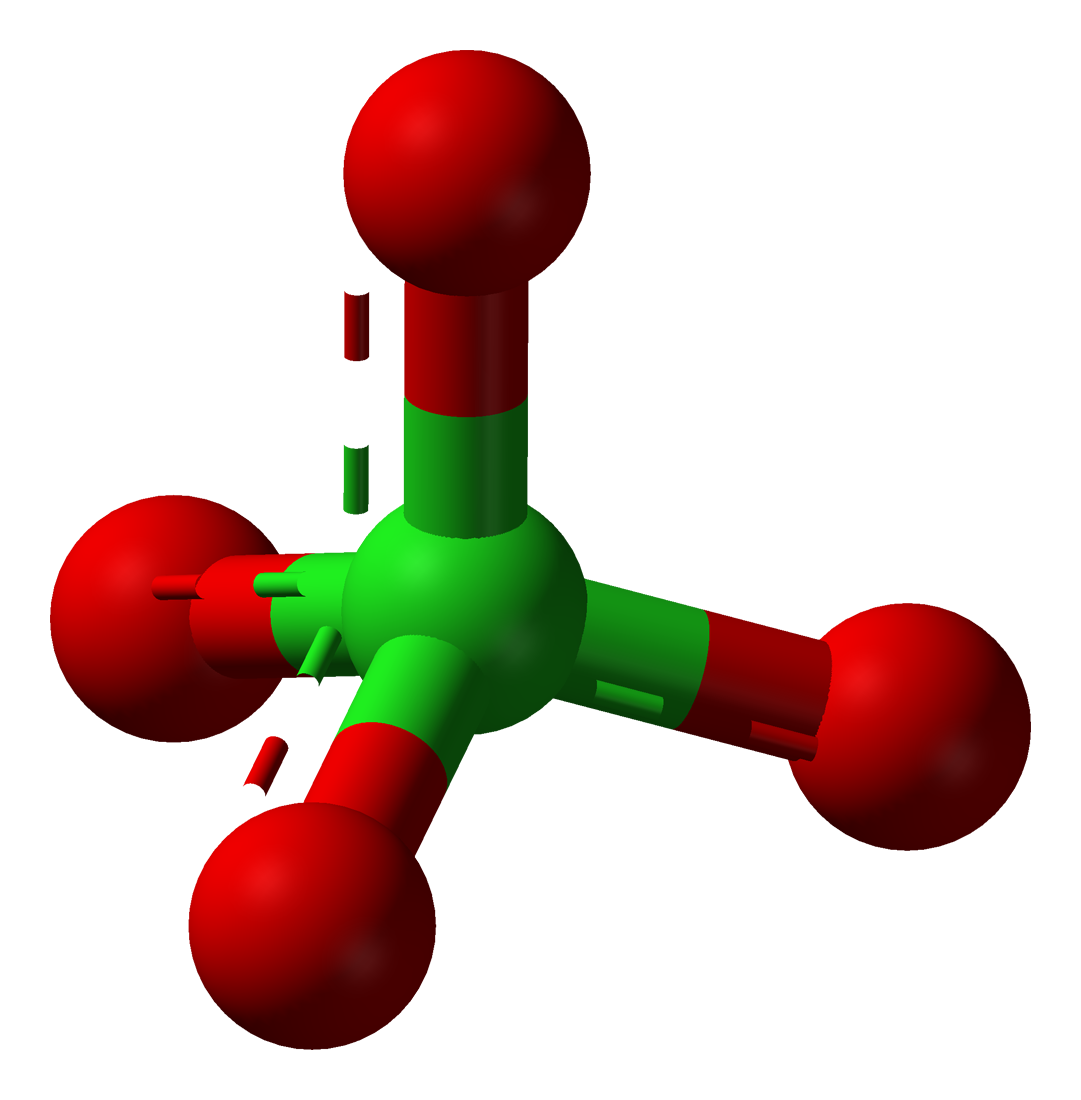
Perchlorate anion, ClO^{−}_{4}
Chlorine, Cl
Oxygen, O

Names
- Other names: Oxonium perchlorate; Perchloric acid monohydrate

Identifiers
CAS Number	13444-99-0
3D model (JSmol)	Interactive image
ChemSpider	25936644
PubChem CID	85613441; 163195842
- InChI: InChI=1S/ClHO4.H2O/c2-1(3,4)5;/h(H,2,3,4,5);1H2 Key: AIUIJBDEQKTMHT-UHFFFAOYSA-N
- SMILES: [OH3+].[O-][Cl](=O)(=O)=O

Properties
Chemical formula	[H_{3}O]ClO_{4}
Molar mass	118.47 g·mol^{−1}
Appearance	Colorless solid
Density	1.96 g/cm^{3}
Melting point	45 °C (113 °F; 318 K)

Structure
Crystal structure	Orthorhombic
Space group	Pnma
Lattice constant	a = 9.2343 Å, b = 5.8178 Å, c = 7.4606 Å

Related compounds
Other cations	Ammonium perchlorate
Related compounds	Perchloric acid; Hydrochloric acid
- Except where otherwise noted, data are given for materials in their standard state (at 25 °C [77 °F], 100 kPa). Infobox references

Hydronium perchlorate is an inorganic chemical compound with the chemical formula [H_{3}O]ClO_{4}. It is an unusual salt due to it being a solid and stable hydronium salt. It consists of hydronium cations [H_{3}O]^{+} and perchlorate anions ClO^{−}_{4}.

== Production ==
Hydronium perchlorate is produced by the reaction of anhydrous perchloric acid and water in a 1:1 molar ratio:

HClO_{4} + H_{2}O → [H_{3}O]^{+}ClO^{−}_{4}

A more analytically reliable method was reported using the macrocyclic Schiff base of sodium 2,6-diformyl-4-methylphenolate and 2,6-diformyl-4-methylphenol as a chelating agent to sequester Cu(II): transmetallation of the macrocycle with copper(II) perchlorate yielded colorless crystals of hydronium perchlorate.

It can also be produced by the reaction of anhydrous nitric acid and perchloric acid.
