= Hydrogen ion =

Hydrogen atom that has gained or lost an electron

A hydrogen ion is an ion created when a hydrogen atom loses or gains an electron. A positively charged hydrogen ion (or proton) can readily combine with other particles and therefore is only seen isolated when it is in a gaseous state or a nearly particle-free space. Due to its extremely high charge density of approximately 2×10^{10} times that of a sodium ion, the bare hydrogen ion cannot exist freely in solution as it readily hydrates, i.e., bonds quickly. The hydrogen ion is recommended by IUPAC as a general term for all ions of hydrogen and its isotopes. Depending on the charge of the ion, two different classes can be distinguished: positively charged ions (hydrons) and negatively charged (hydride) ions.

== Cation (positively charged) ==
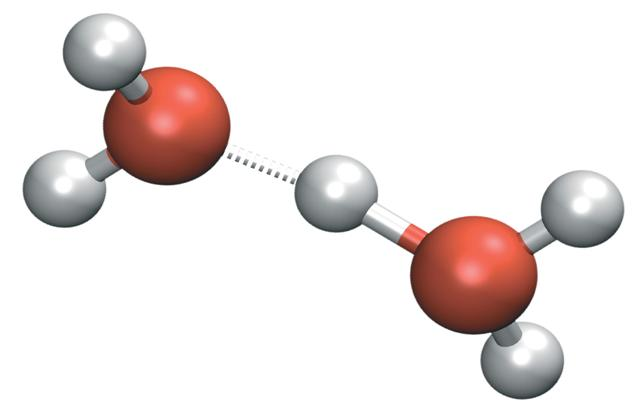
Zundel cation

A hydrogen atom is made up of a nucleus with charge +1, and a single electron. Therefore, the only positively charged ion possible has charge +1. It is notated H^{+}.

Depending on the isotope in question, the hydrogen cation has different names:

- Hydron: general name referring to the positive ion of any hydrogen isotope (H^{+})
- Proton: ^{1}H^{+} (i.e. the cation of protium)
- Deuteron: ^{2}H^{+}, D^{+}
- Triton: ^{3}H^{+}, T^{+}

In addition, the ions produced by the reaction of these cations with water as well as their hydrates are called hydrogen ions:

- Hydronium ion: H_{3}O^{+}
- Zundel cation: H_{5}O^{+}_{2} (named for Georg Zundel)
- Eigen cation: H_{9}O^{+}_{4} (or H_{3}O^{+}·3H_{2}O) (named for Manfred Eigen)

Zundel cations and Eigen cations play an important role in proton diffusion according to the Grotthuss mechanism.

In connection with acids, "hydrogen ions" typically refers to hydrons.

Definitions of cations and anions

In the image at left the hydrogen atom (center) contains a single proton and a single electron. Removal of the electron gives a cation (left), whereas addition of an electron gives an anion (right). The hydrogen anion, with its loosely held two-electron cloud, has a larger radius than the neutral atom, which in turn is much larger than the bare proton of the cation. Hydrogen forms the only cation that has no electrons, but even cations that (unlike hydrogen) still retain one or more electrons are still smaller than the neutral atoms or molecules from which they are derived.

== Anion (negatively charged) ==
Hydrogen anions are formed when additional electrons are acquired:

- Hydride: general name referring to the negative ion of any hydrogen isotope (H^{−})
- Protide: ^{1}H^{−}
- Deuteride: ^{2}H^{−}, D^{−}
- Tritide: ^{3}H^{−}, T^{−}

== Uses ==
Hydrogen ions drive ATP synthase in photosynthesis. This happens when hydrogen ions get pushed across the membrane creating a high concentration inside the thylakoid membrane and a low concentration in the cytoplasm. However, because of osmosis, the H^{+} will force itself out of the membrane through ATP synthase. Using their kinetic energy to escape, the protons will spin the ATP synthase which in turn will create ATP. This happens in cellular respiration as well though the concentrated membrane will instead be the inner membrane of the mitochondria.

Hydrogen ions concentration, measured as pH, is also responsible for the acidic or basic nature of a compound. Water molecules split to form H^{+} and hydroxide anions. This process is referred to as the self-ionization of water.

== Ocean acidification ==
The concentration of hydrogen ions and pH are inversely proportional; in an aqueous solution, an increased concentration of hydrogen ions yields a low pH, and subsequently, an acidic product. By definition, an acid is an ion or molecule that can donate a proton, and when introduced to a solution it will react with water molecules (H_{2}O) to form a hydronium ion (H_{3}O^{+}), a conjugate acid of water. For simplistic reasoning, the hydrogen ion (H^{+}) is often used to abbreviate the hydronium ion.

Ocean acidification is the direct consequence of elevated concentrations of hydrogen ions and carbonate saturation from significant absorption of carbon dioxide (CO_{2}) by the world's oceans. The pre-industrial state of the ocean's carbonate chemistry has been notably stable, including the balance of its pH. Following the industrial revolution, anthropogenic emissions of burning fossil fuels, cement production, and changes in land use, have increased the oceans uptake of carbon dioxide from the atmosphere by 30%. In the ocean, the absorption capacity of this greenhouse gas is 59 times higher than in the atmosphere; the ocean acts as the largest carbon sink on the planet, playing a significant role in climate regulation. In addition to carbon fluxes, the natural process of carbon sequestration from the atmosphere into the deep ocean is facilitated by two systems, the biological pump and the solubility pump. The solubility pump is a physico-chemical process that transfers CO_{2} at the air-sea interface. Based on Henry's Law, the amount of dissolved CO_{2} in an aqueous solution is directly proportional to the partial pressure of CO_{2} in the atmosphere. To maintain equilibrium, a state of high atmospheric partial pressure of CO_{2} leads to an increased oceanic exchange of this gas by molecular diffusion.

In the surface waters, dissolved atmospheric carbon dioxide (CO_{2(aq)}) reacts with water molecules to form carbonic acid (H_{2}CO_{3}), a weak diprotic acid. Diprotic acids consist of two ionizable hydrogen atoms in each molecule. In an aqueous solution, partial dissociation of carbonic acid releases a hydrogen proton (H^{+}) and a bicarbonate ion (HCO^{−}_{3}), and subsequently, the bicarbonate ion dissociates into an additional hydrogen proton and a carbonate ion (CO^{2−}_{3}). The dissolving and dissociating of these inorganic carbon species generate an increase in the concentration of hydrogen ions and inversely lowers ambient surface ocean pH. The carbonate buffering system governs the acidity of seawater by maintaining dissolved inorganic carbon species in chemical equilibrium.

The chemical equation consists of reactants and products that may react in either direction. More reactants added to a system yield more product production (the chemical reaction shifts to the right) and if more product is added, additional reactants will form, shifting the chemical reaction to the left. Therefore, in this model, a high concentration of the beginning reactant, carbon dioxide, produces an increased amount of end-product (H^{+} and CO^{2−}_{3}), thus lowering pH and creating a more acidic solution. The natural buffering system of the ocean resist the change in pH by producing more bicarbonate ions generated by free acid protons reacting with carbonate ions to form an alkaline character. However, increasing atmospheric CO_{2} concentrations may exceed the buffering capacity threshold, consequently resulting in higher rates of ocean acidification. Shifts in the ocean's carbonate chemistry has the potential to manipulate ocean biogeochemical cycles for many elements and compounds causing profound impacts on marine ecosystems. Furthermore, the solubility of CO_{2} is temperature dependent; elevated surface water temperatures reduce CO_{2} solubility. A continual rise in atmospheric partial pressure of CO_{2} could potentially convert the ocean from acting as sink (the vertical transport of carbon to the depths of the ocean) to becoming a source (CO_{2} degassing from the ocean), further increasing global temperatures.

== See also ==
- Acid
- Protonation
- Dihydrogen cation
- Trihydrogen cation
