= Sandmeyer reaction =

Chemical reaction used to synthesize aryl halides from aryl diazonium salts

Named after	Traugott Sandmeyer
Reaction type	Substitution reaction

Identifiers
Organic Chemistry Portal	sandmeyer-reaction
RSC ontology ID	RXNO:0000021

The Sandmeyer reaction is a chemical reaction used to synthesize aryl halides from aryl diazonium salts using copper salts as reagents or catalysts. It is an example of a radical-nucleophilic aromatic substitution. The Sandmeyer reaction provides a method through which one can perform unique transformations on benzene, such as halogenation, cyanation, trifluoromethylation, and hydroxylation.

The reaction was discovered in 1884 by Swiss chemist Traugott Sandmeyer, when he attempted to synthesize phenylacetylene from benzenediazonium chloride and copper(I) acetylide. Instead, the main product he isolated was chlorobenzene. In modern times, the Sandmeyer reaction refers to any method for substitution of an aromatic amino group via preparation of its diazonium salt followed by its displacement with a nucleophile in the presence of catalytic copper(I) salts.

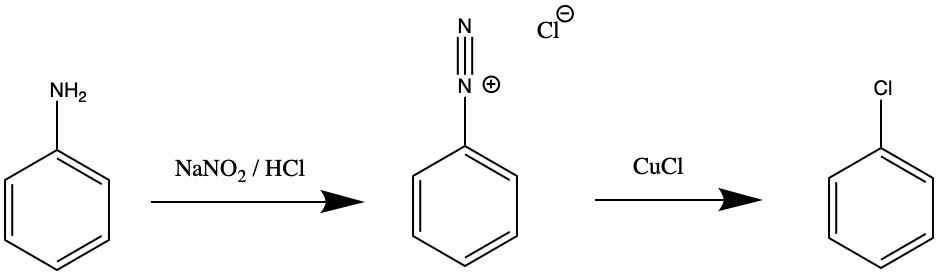

The most commonly employed Sandmeyer reactions are the chlorination, bromination, cyanation, and hydroxylation reactions using CuCl, CuBr, CuCN, and Cu_{2}O, respectively. More recently, trifluoromethylation of diazonium salts has been developed and is referred to as a 'Sandmeyer-type' reaction. Diazonium salts also react with boronates, iodide, thiols, water, hypophosphorous acid and others, and fluorination can be carried out using tetrafluoroborate anions (Balz–Schiemann reaction). However, since these processes do not require a metal catalyst, they are not usually referred to as Sandmeyer reactions. In numerous variants that have been developed, other transition metal salts, including copper(II), iron(III) and cobalt(III) have also been employed. Due to its wide synthetic applicability, the Sandmeyer reaction, along with other transformations of diazonium compounds, is complementary to electrophilic aromatic substitution.

== Reaction mechanism ==
The Sandmeyer reaction is an example of a radical-nucleophilic aromatic substitution (S_{RN}Ar). The radical mechanism of the Sandmeyer reaction is supported by the detection of biaryl byproducts. The substitution of the aromatic diazo group with a halogen or pseudohalogen is initiated by a one-electron transfer mechanism catalyzed by copper(I) to form an aryl radical with loss of nitrogen gas. The substituted arene is possibly formed by direct transfer of Cl, Br, CN, or OH from a copper(II) species to the aryl radical to produce the substituted arene and regenerate the copper(I) catalyst. In an alternative proposal, a transient copper(III) intermediate, formed from coupling of the aryl radical with the copper(II) species, undergoes rapid reductive elimination to afford the product and regenerate copper(I). However, evidence for such an organocopper intermediate is weak and mostly circumstantial, and the exact pathway may depend on the substrate and reaction conditions.

=== Single electron transfer ===
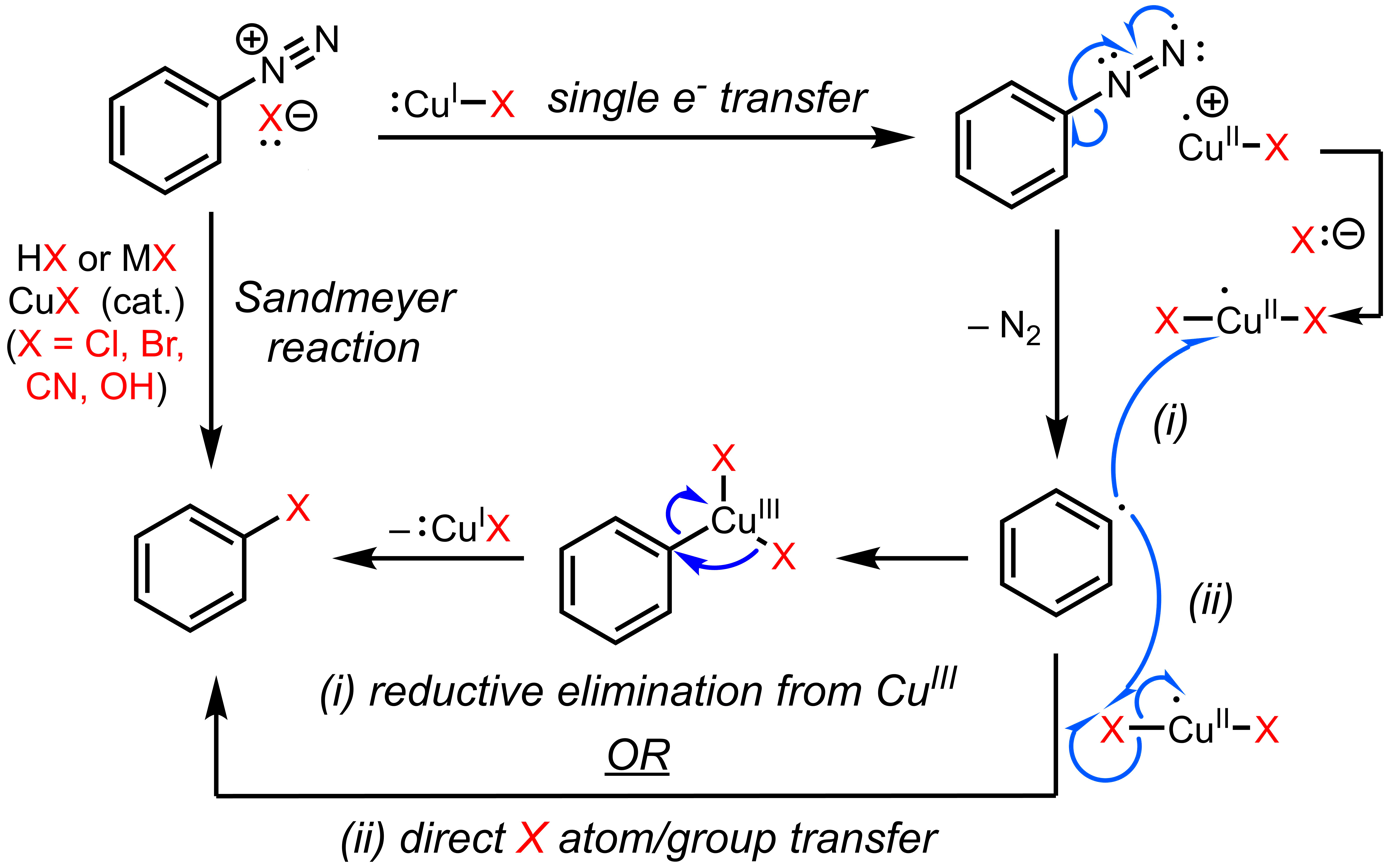

== Synthetic applications ==
Variations on the Sandmeyer reaction have been developed to fit multiple synthetic applications. These reactions typically proceed through the formation of an aryl diazonium salt followed by a reaction with a copper(I) salt to yield a substituted arene:

There are many synthetic applications of the Sandmeyer reaction.

=== Halogenation ===
One of the most important uses of the Sandmeyer reaction is the formation of aryl halides. The solvent of choice for the synthesis of iodoarenes is diiodomethane, while for the synthesis of bromoarenes, bromoform is used. For the synthesis of chloroarenes, chloroform is the solvent of choice. The synthesis of (+)-curcuphenol, a bioactive compound that displays antifungal and anticancer activity, employs the Sandmeyer reaction to substitute an amine group by a bromo group.

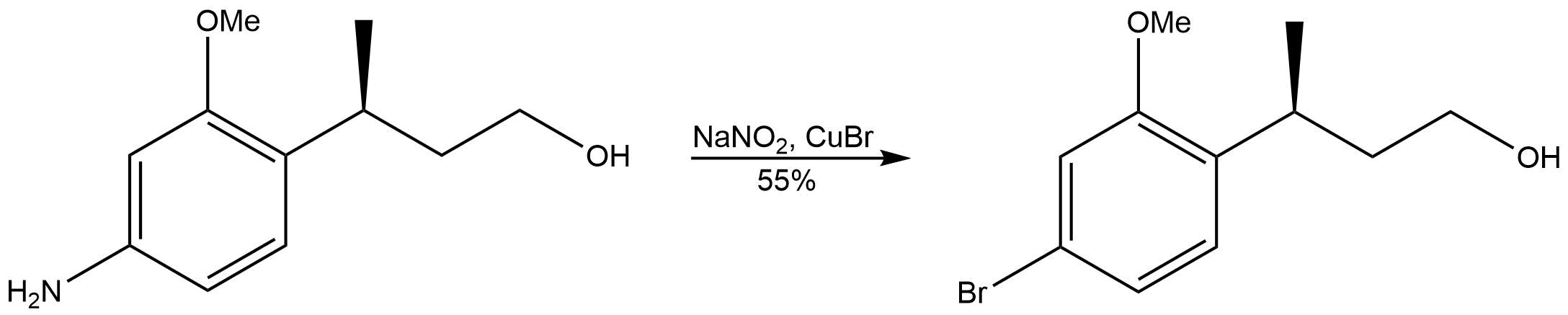

One bromination protocol employs a Cu(I)/Cu(II) mixture with additional amounts of the bidentate ligand phenanthroline and phase-transfer catalyst dibenzo-18-crown-6 to convert an aryl diazonium tetrafluoroborate salt to an aryl bromide.

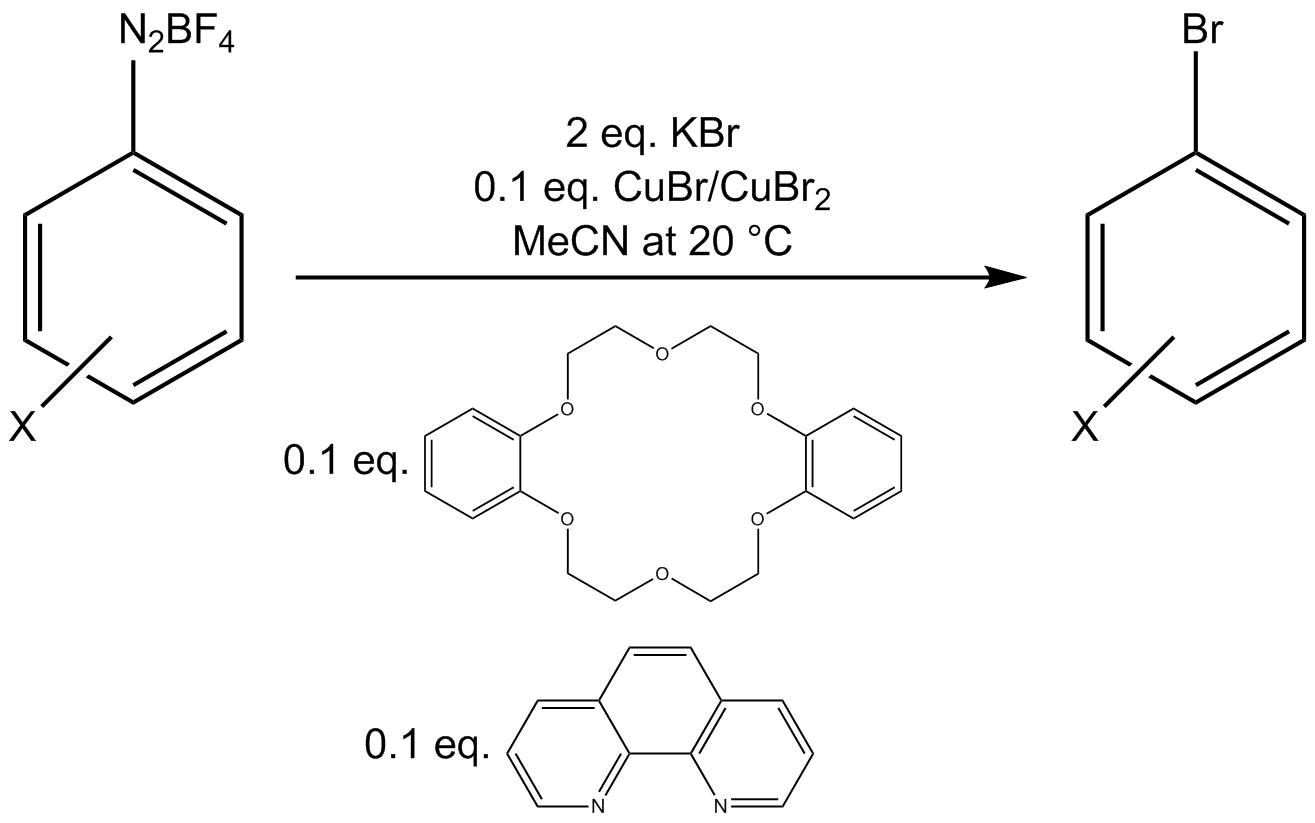

The Balz–Schiemann reaction uses tetrafluoroborate and delivers the halide-substituted product, fluorobenzene, which is not obtained by the use of copper fluorides. This reaction displays motifs characteristic of the Sandmeyer reaction.

=== Cyanation ===
Another use of the Sandmeyer reaction is for cyanation which allows for the formation of benzonitriles, an important class of organic compounds. A key intermediate in the synthesis of the antipsychotic drug Fluanxol is synthesized by a cyanation through the Sandmeyer reaction.

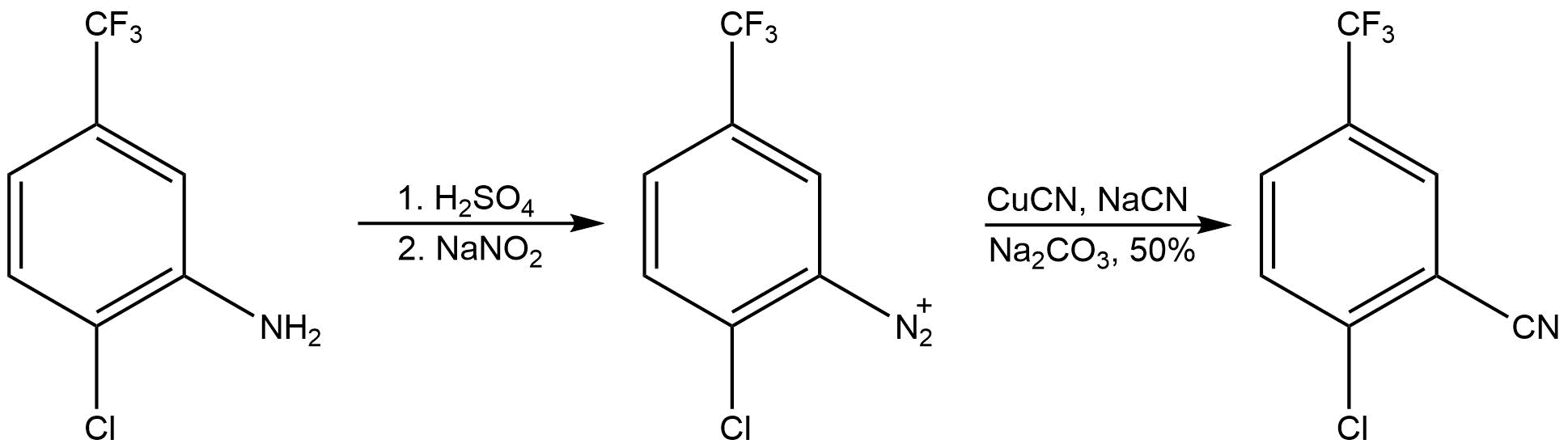

The Sandmeyer reaction has also been employed in the synthesis of neoamphimedine, a compound that is suggested to target topoisomerase II as an anti-cancer drug.

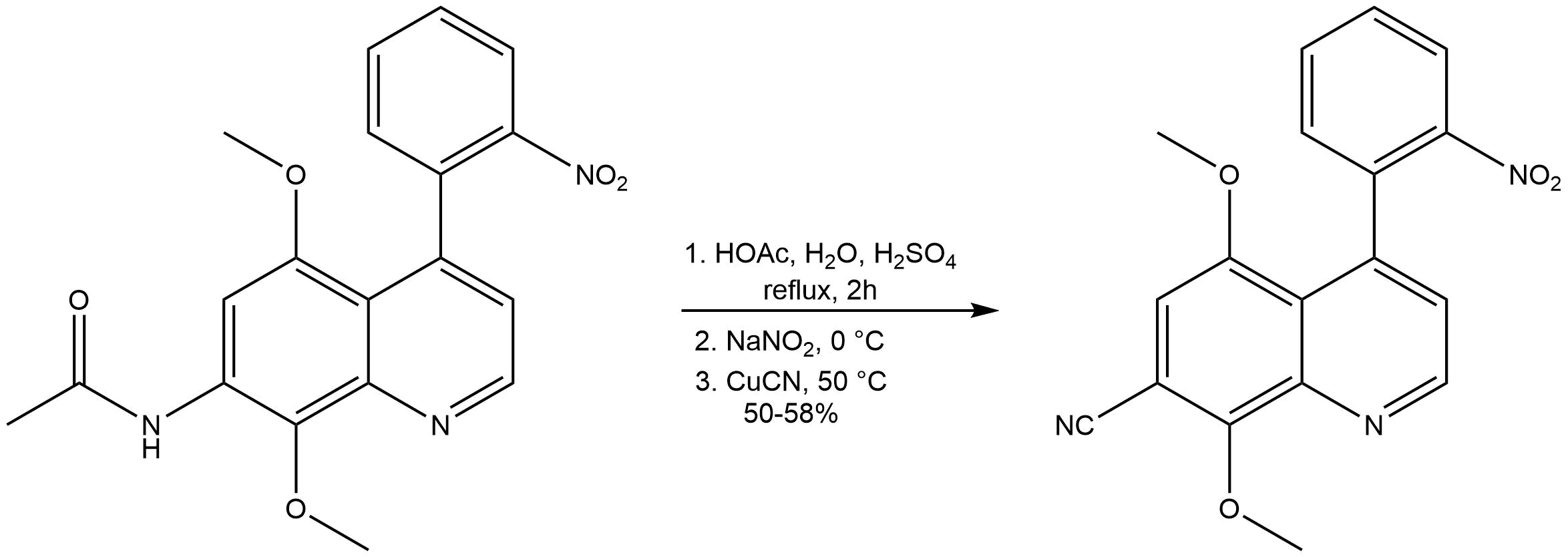

=== Trifluoromethylation ===
It has been demonstrated that Sandmeyer-type reactions can be used to generate aryl compounds functionalized by trifluoromethyl substituent groups. This process of trifluoromethylation provides unique chemical properties with a wide variety of practical applications. Particularly, pharmaceuticals with CF_{3} groups have enhanced metabolic stability, lipophilicity, and bioavailability. Sandmeyer-type trifluoromethylation reactions feature mild reaction conditions and greater functional group tolerance relative to earlier methods of trifluoromethylation. An example of a Sandmeyer-type trifluoromethylation reaction is presented below.

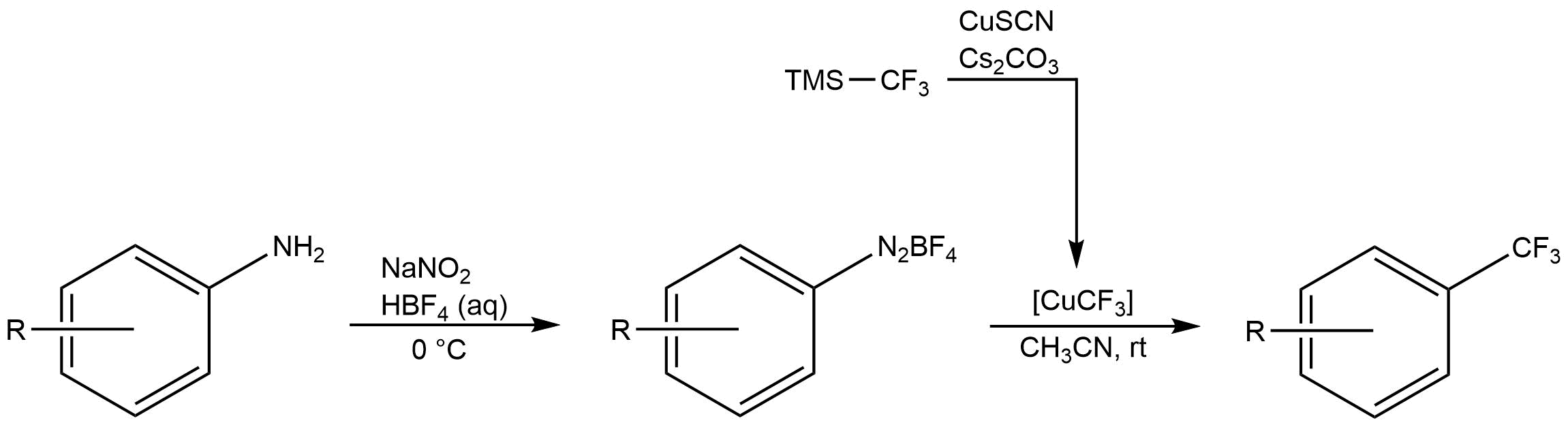

=== Hydroxylation ===
The Sandmeyer reaction can also be used to convert aryl amines to phenols proceeding through the formation of an aryl diazonium salt. In the presence of copper catalyst, such as copper(I) oxide, and an excess of copper(II) nitrate, this reaction takes place readily at room temperature neutral water. This is in contrast to the classical procedure (known by the German name Verkochung), which calls for boiling the diazonium salt in aqueous acid, a process that is believed to involve the aryl cation instead of radical and is known to generate other nucleophilic addition side products in addition to the desired hydroxylation product.

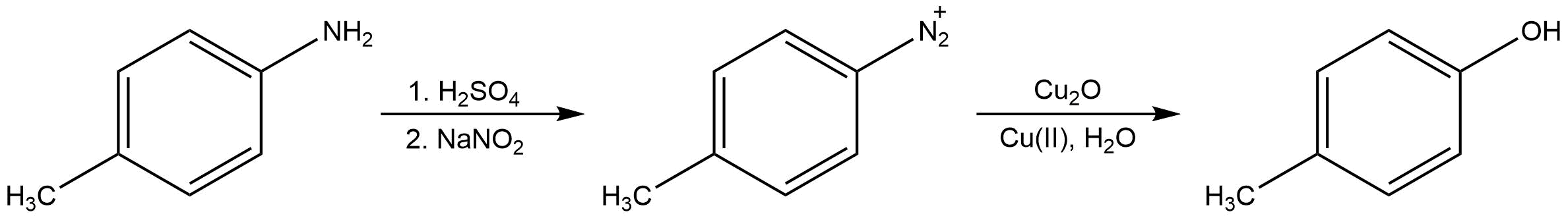
