= SRN1 =

SRN1 may refer to:

- SR-N1, the first practical hovercraft
- SR N1 class, a class of locomotives
- Radical-nucleophilic aromatic substitution (S_{RN}1), a type of substitution reaction in organic chemistry
