= Astatobenzene =

Names
- Preferred IUPAC name phenylastatine

Identifiers
3D model (JSmol)	Interactive image
Abbreviations	PhAt
ChemSpider	67160605
PubChem CID	15242632
- InChI: InChI=1S/C6H5At/c7-6-4-2-1-3-5-6/h1-5H Key: AQJDUTRRKMRFRS-UHFFFAOYSA-N
- SMILES: C1=CC=C(C=C1)[At]

Properties
Chemical formula	C_{6}H_{5}At
Molar mass	287 g·mol^{−1}

Related compounds
Related halobenzenes	Fluorobenzene; Chlorobenzene; Bromobenzene; Iodobenzene
- Except where otherwise noted, data are given for materials in their standard state (at 25 °C [77 °F], 100 kPa). Infobox references

Astatobenzene is an organoastatine chemical compound with the formula C_{6}H_{5}At. This is a compound in which an astatine atom, the rarest halogen, is bonded to a benzene ring.

== Synthesis ==
Several methods of obtaining astatobenzene are described.

Homogeneous exchange between iodobenzene and astatine iodide at room temperature:

C_{6}H_{5}I + AtI → C_{6}H_{5}At + I_{2}

Also, synthesis from phenylhydrazine and astatine iodide:

C_{6}H_{5}NHNH_{2} + AtI + I_{2} → C_{6}H_{5}At + N_{2} + 3 HI

Also, thermal decomposition of diphenyliodonium iodide containing diphenyliodonium astatide:

(C_{6}H_{5})_{2}IAt → C_{6}H_{5}At + C_{6}H_{5}I

== Uses ==
The compound is of scientific interest primarily in research contexts involving astatine chemistry and radiopharmaceutical applications, where astatine radioactive isotopes are used.
