= Cyanation =

Chemical reaction

In organic synthesis, cyanation is the attachment or substitution of a cyanide group on various substrates. Such transformations are high-value because they generate C-C bonds. Furthermore nitriles are versatile functional groups.

== Cyanation to form sp^{3} nitriles ==
Typically, alkyl nitriles are formed via S_{N}1 or S_{N}2-type cyanation with alkyl electrophiles. Illustrative is the synthesis of benzyl cyanide by the reaction of benzyl chloride and sodium cyanide. In some cases cuprous cyanide is used instead of sodium cyanide.

Cyanation of ketones or aldehydes yields the corresponding cyanohydrins, which can be done directly with the cyanide ion (the cyanohydrin reaction) or by using bisulfite, followed by displacement of sulfite:

Cyanation of aldehyde with bisulfite

A related reaction is hydrocyanation, which installs the elements of H-CN.

== Cyanation of arenes ==
Cyanation of arenes offers access to benzoic acid derivatives, as well as the utility of aryl nitriles themselves in as fine chemicals:

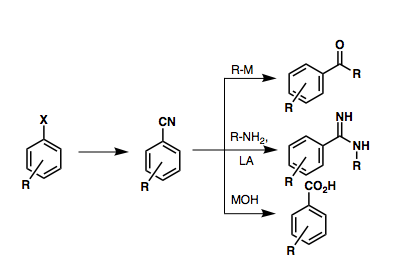

A variety of mechanistically distinct pathways are known to cyanate arenes:

=== With arene as two-electron electrophile ===
While the classical Rosenmund Von-Braun reaction utilizes stoichiometric copper(I) cyanide as a cyanation source, newer variants have been developed that are catalytic in copper:

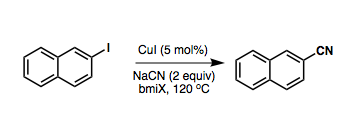

In addition, palladium-catalyzed cyanations of aryl halides have been extensively explored. Generally, KCN or its less toxic surrogate Zn(CN)_{2} are used as nucleophilic cyanide sources. To further diminish toxicity concerns, potassium ferricyanide has also been used as a cyanide source. Catalytic cycles are believed to proceed through a standard Pd (0/II) pathway with reductive elimination forging the key C-C bond. Deactivation of Pd(II) with excess cyanide is a common problem. Palladium catalysis conditions for aryl iodides, bromides, and even chlorides have been developed:

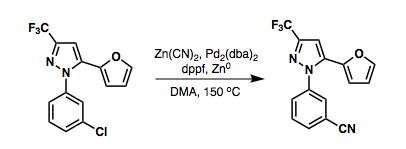

Nickel-catalyzed cyanations avoid the use of precious metals, and can take advantage of benzyl cyanide or acetonitrile as a cyanide source, via reductive C-C bond cleavage:

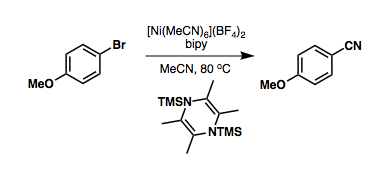

Sandmeyer cyanation is a means of converting aniline derivatives to benzonitriles. The cyanation is generally postulated to be two-electron, while with radical mediators in absence of metals, the reaction is likely radical.

=== With arene as a two-electron nucleophile ===
Metalated arenes can be cyanated with electrophilic cyanide sources, including cyanamides, cyanates, dimethylmalononitrile, or ethyl (ethoxymethylene)cyanoacetate. These methods can proceed with or without transition metal mediation:

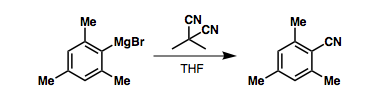

=== With arene as a radical electrophile ===
Radical approaches to arene C-H cyanation are known. Photoredox mediators (metallic or organic) are most common:

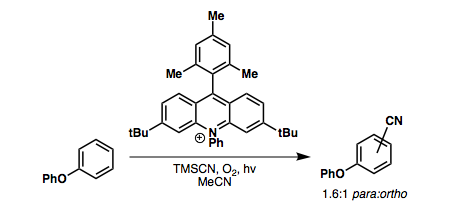
