= Radical-nucleophilic aromatic substitution =

Radical-nucleophilic aromatic substitution or S_{RN}1 in organic chemistry is a type of substitution reaction in which a certain substituent on an aromatic compound is replaced by a nucleophile through an intermediary free radical species:

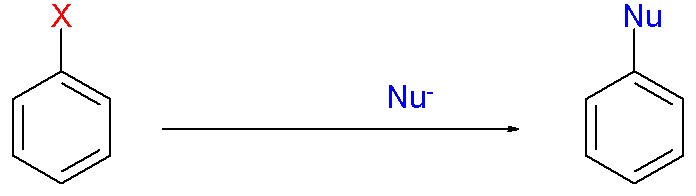
Radical-nucleophilic aromatic substitution overview

The substituent X is a halide and nucleophiles can be sodium amide, an alkoxide or a carbon nucleophile such as an enolate. In contrast to regular nucleophilic aromatic substitution, deactivating groups on the arene are not required.

This reaction type was discovered in 1970 by Bunnett and Kim and the abbreviation S_{RN}1 stands for substitution radical-nucleophilic unimolecular as it shares properties with an aliphatic S_{N}1 reaction. An example of this reaction type is the Sandmeyer reaction.

== Reaction mechanism ==
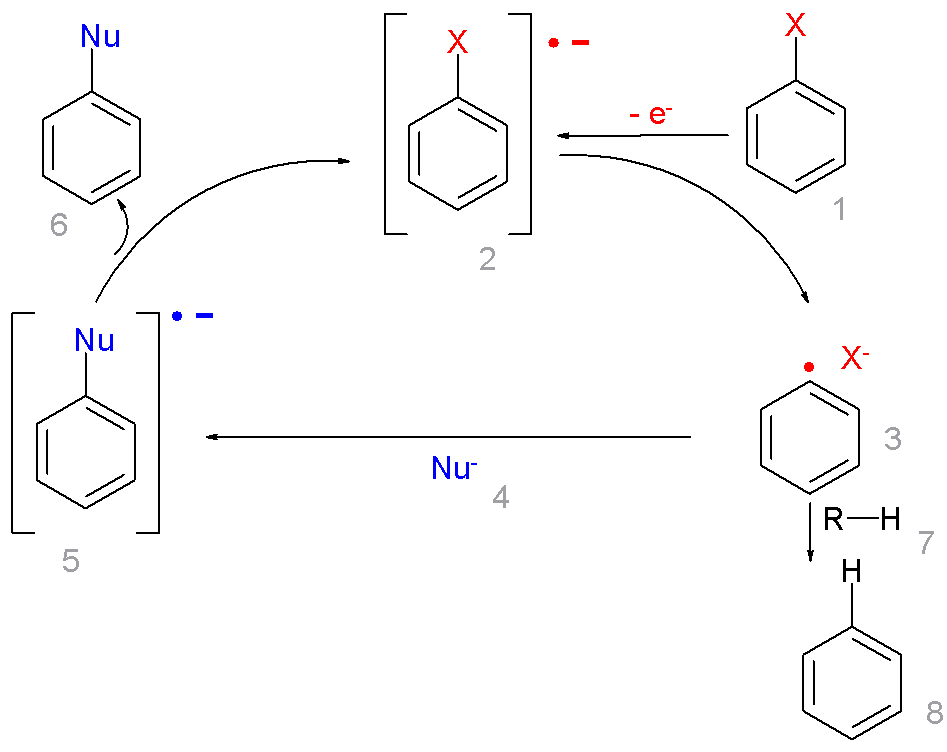
Radical-nucleophilic aromatic substitution mechanism

In this radical substitution the aryl halide 1 accepts an electron from a radical initiator forming a radical anion 2. This intermediate collapses into an aryl radical 3 and a halide anion. The aryl radical reacts with the nucleophile 4 to a new radical anion 5 which goes on to form the substituted product by transferring its electron to new aryl halide in the chain propagation. Alternatively the phenyl radical can abstract any loose proton from 7 forming the arene 8 in a chain termination reaction.

The involvement of a radical intermediate in a new type of nucleophilic aromatic substitution was invoked when the product distribution was compared between a certain aromatic chloride and an aromatic iodide in reaction with potassium amide. The chloride reaction proceeds through a classical aryne intermediate:

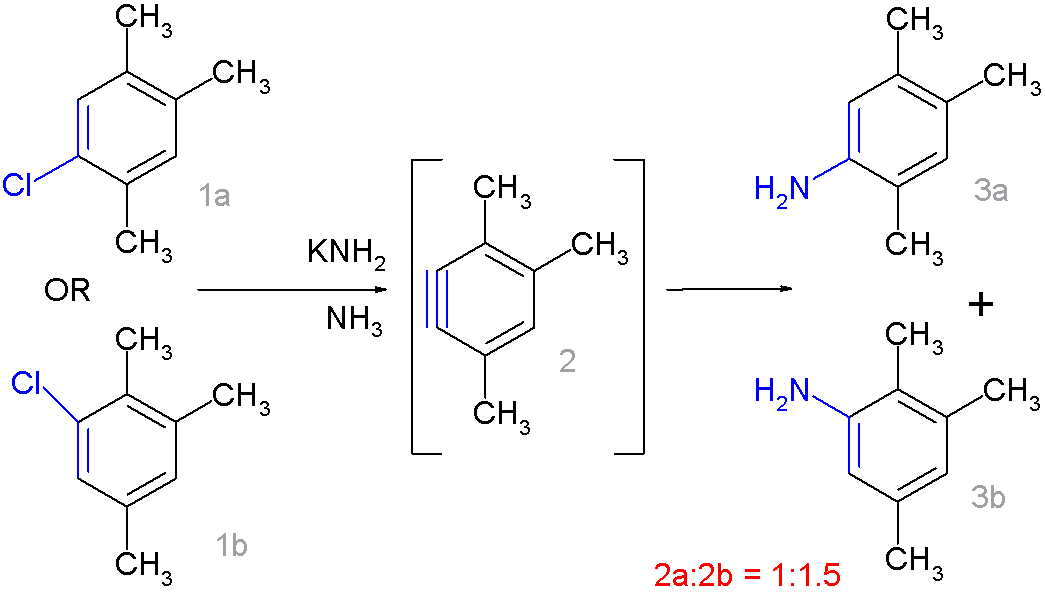
AryneReaction Bunnett 1970

The isomers 1a and 1b form the same aryne 2 which continues to react to the anilines 3a and 3b in a 1 to 1.5 ratio. Clear-cut cine-substitution would give a 1:1 ratio, but additional steric and electronic factors come into play as well.

Replacing chlorine by iodine in the 1,2,4-trimethylbenzene moiety drastically changes the product distribution:

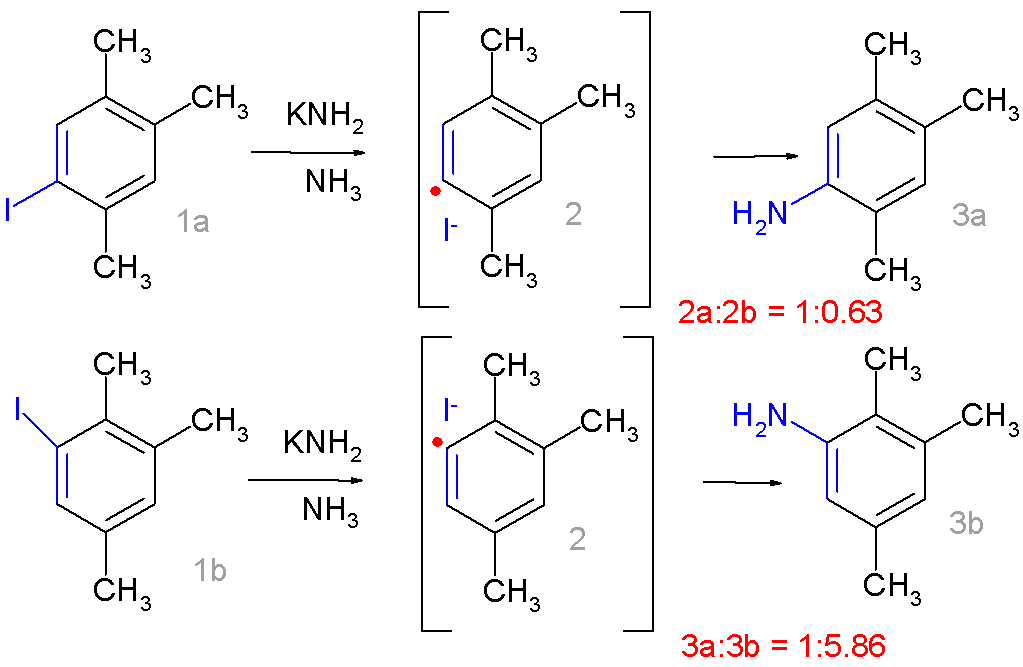
Radical-nucleophilic aromatic substitution Bunnett 1970

It now resembles ipso-substitution with 1a forming preferentially 3a and 1b forming 3b. Radical scavengers suppress ipso-substitution in favor of cine-substitution and the addition of potassium metal as an electron donor and radical initiator does exactly the opposite.

== See also ==
- Birch reduction
- Nucleophilic aromatic substitution
