= Chlorobenzene (data page) =

Chemical data page

This page provides supplementary chemical data on Chlorobenzene.

== Material Safety Data Sheet ==
The handling of this chemical may incur notable safety precautions. It is highly recommend that you seek the Material Safety Datasheet (MSDS) for this chemical from a reliable source and follow its directions. An external MSDS is available here.

== Structure and properties ==
Structure and properties
Index of refraction, n_{D}	1.5241
Abbe number	?
Dielectric constant, ε_{r}	5.6895 at 293.2 K
Bond strength	?
Bond length	?
Bond angle	?
Magnetic susceptibility, χ_{m}	69.5 ×10^{−6} cm^{3} mol^{−1}
Surface tension, $\gamma$	34.78 dyn/cm at 10°C; 32.99 dyn/cm at 25°C; 30.02 dyn/cm at 50°C; 27.04 dyn/cm at 75°C; 24.06 dyn/cm at 100°C
Speed of Sound	1311 m/s at 20°C

== Thermodynamic properties ==
Phase behavior
Triple point	? K (? °C), ? Pa
Critical point	633.4 K (360.25°C), 4.52 MPa
Std enthalpy change of fusion, Δ_{fus}H^{~~o~~}	? kJ/mol
Std entropy change of fusion, Δ_{fus}S^{~~o~~}	9.6 J/(mol·K)
Std enthalpy change of vaporization, Δ_{vap}H^{~~o~~}	40.97 kJ/mol
Std entropy change of vaporization, Δ_{vap}S^{~~o~~}	? J/(mol·K)
Solid properties
Std enthalpy change of formation, Δ_{f}H^{~~o~~}_{solid}	? kJ/mol
Standard molar entropy, S^{~~o~~}_{solid}	? J/(mol K)
Specific heat capacity, c_{p}	? J/(mol K)
Liquid properties
Std enthalpy change of formation, Δ_{f}H^{~~o~~}_{liquid}	11.1 kJ/mol
Standard molar entropy, S^{~~o~~}_{liquid}	? J/(mol K)
Specific heat capacity, c_{p}	150.1 J/(mol K)
Gas properties
Std enthalpy change of formation, Δ_{f}H^{~~o~~}_{gas}	52.0 kJ/mol
Standard molar entropy, S^{~~o~~}_{gas}	? J/(mol K)
Specific heat capacity, c_{p}	? J/(mol K)
Van der Waals' constants	a = 25.8 L^{2}bar/mol^{2} b = 0.1454 L/mol
Other properties
Std molar enthalpy of hydration of gas, Δ_{hyd}H^{∞} = Δ_{sol}H^{∞} - Δ_{vap}H^{~~o~~}	-30.6 kJ/mol @ 298.15K

== Vapor pressure of liquid ==
P in Pa	10	100	1k	10k	100k
T in °C	-43 e	-17 e	16.8	62.9	131.3

e - extrapolated data

== Viscosity of liquid ==
T in °C	-25	0	25	50	75	100
Viscosity in mPa s	1.703	1.058	0.753	0.575	0.456	0.369

== Thermal Conductivity of liquid ==
T in °C	-25	0	25	50	75	100
Conductivity in W/m K	0.137	0.132	0.127	0.123	0.118	0.113

== Spectral data ==
UV-Vis
λ_{max}	? nm
Extinction coefficient, ε	?
IR
Major absorption bands	? cm^{−1}
NMR
Proton NMR
Carbon-13 NMR
Other NMR data
MS
Masses of main fragments

This box:
- Except where noted otherwise, data relate to Standard temperature and pressure.
- Reliability of data general note.
