= Traugott Sandmeyer =

Swiss chemical engineer (1854–1922)

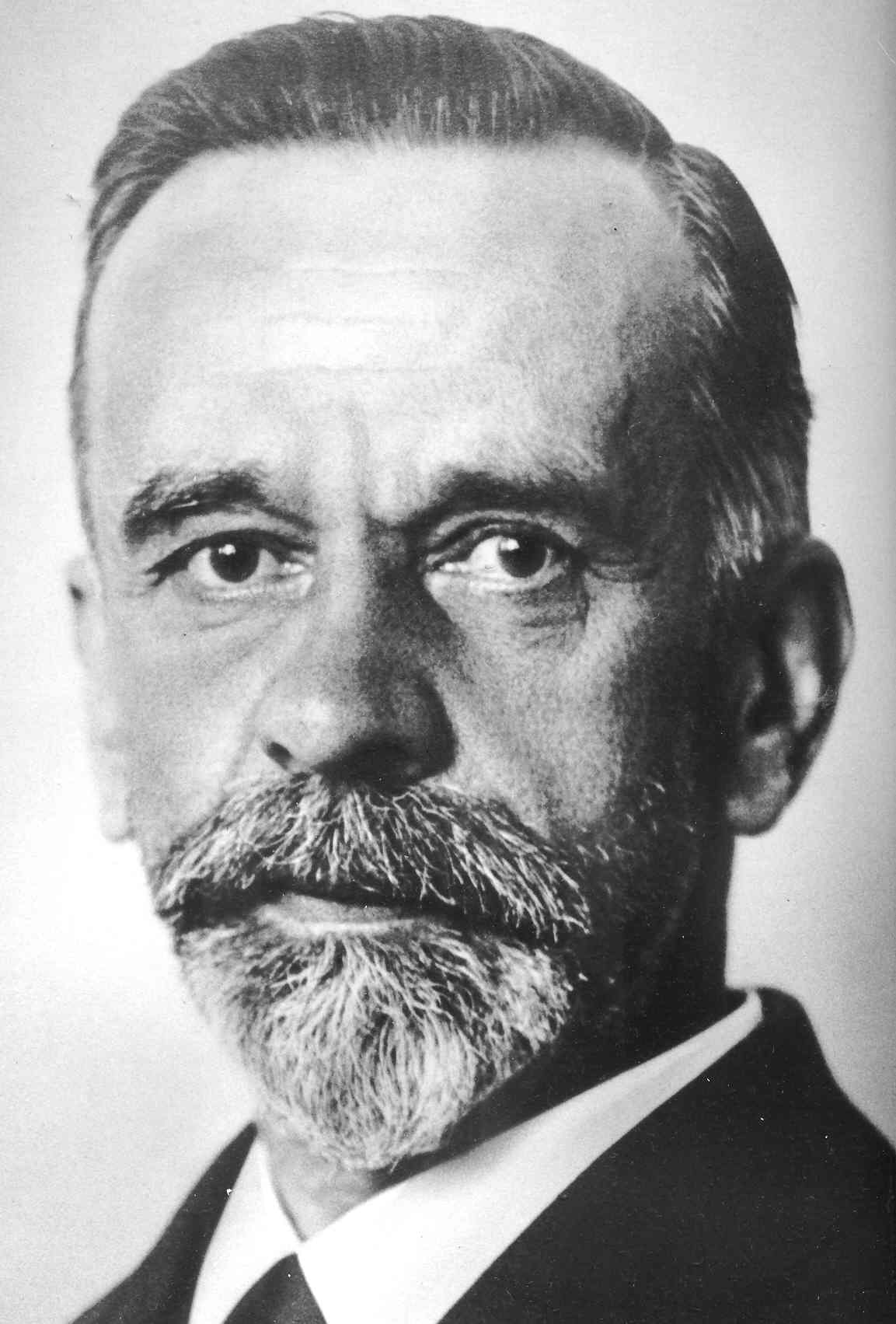
- Traugott Sandmeyer
- Born: 15 September 1854; Wettingen, Switzerland
- Died: 9 April 1922 (aged 67); Zollikon, Switzerland
- Known for: Sandmeyer reaction, Sandmeyer isonitrosoacetanilide isatin synthesis, Sandmeyer diphenylurea isatin synthesis
- Scientific career
- Workplaces: Polytechnikum of Zurich, University of Göttingen
- Doctoral advisors: Viktor Meyer, Arthur Rudolf Hantzsch

Traugott Sandmeyer (15 September 1854 – 9 April 1922) was a Swiss chemist after whom the Sandmeyer reaction, which he discovered in 1884, was named.

== Biography ==
Sandmeyer was born as the last of seven children and attended school in Aarau, studying to become a precision mechanic. His friend, J. Gustav Schmidt, studied chemistry at the Polytechnikum of Zurich (ETH), and their cooperation in conducting experiments led to Sandmeyer's close contact with chemistry.

In 1882, Sandmeyer was made a chemistry lecturer at the ETH by Viktor Meyer. Meyer and Sandmeyer collaborated in studying the synthesis of thiophene, which Meyer had discovered earlier. When Meyer moved to the University of Göttingen, Sandmeyer followed, but then returned to Zürich after a year to work with Arthur Rudolf Hantzsch.

Sandmeyer began his career in industry in 1888 with Johann Rudolf Geigy-Merian, who was the owner of the chemical factory J. R. Geigy & Cie (later Ciba Geigy, now Novartis). Sandmeyer was involved in the development of several dyes and invented a new synthesis for indigo.

He also worked on the synthesis of isatin. and several reactions have been named after him: Sandmeyer isonitrosoacetanilide isatin synthesis(1919) and Sandmeyer diphenylurea isatin synthesis(1903).
