= Dow process (phenol) =

Method of phenol production

The Dow process process is a method of phenol production through the hydrolysis of chlorobenzene.

== Details ==
Benzene can be readily converted to chlorobenzene by nucleophilic aromatic substitution via a benzyne intermediate. Chlorobenzene is treated with aqueous sodium hydroxide at 350 °C and 300 bar or molten sodium hydroxide at 350 °C to convert it to sodium phenoxide, which yields phenol upon acidification. When 1-[^{14}C]-1-chlorobenzene was subjected to aqueous NaOH at 395 °C, ipso the substitution product 1-[^{14}C]-phenol was formed in 54% yield, while the cine substitution product 2-[^{14}C]-phenol was formed in 43% yield. This indicates that an elimination-addition (benzyne) mechanism is predominant, with perhaps a small amount of product from addition-elimination (S_{N}Ar).
