= Iodobenzene =

Skeletal formula of iodobenzene
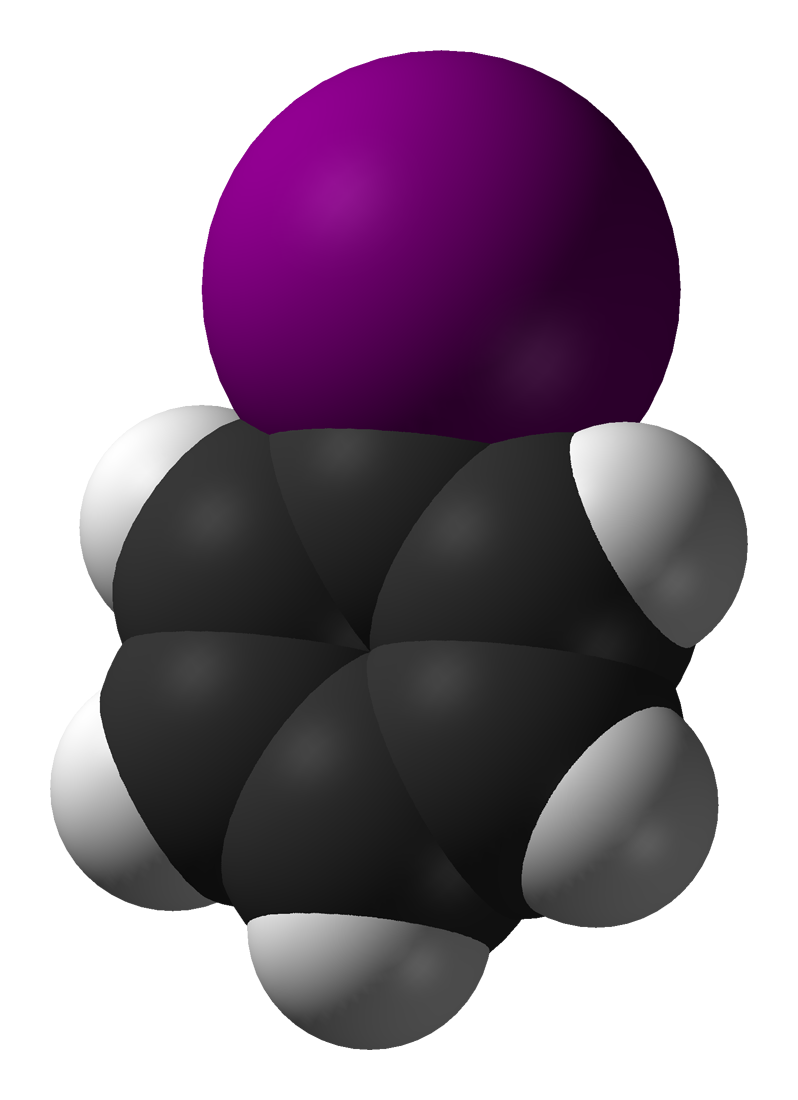
Space-filling model of iodobenzene

Names
- Preferred IUPAC name Iodobenzene
- Other names Phenyl iodide

Identifiers
CAS Number	591-50-4
3D model (JSmol)	Interactive image
Abbreviations	PhI
ChEMBL	ChEMBL116296
ChemSpider	11087
DrugBank	DB02252
ECHA InfoCard	100.008.837
PubChem CID	11575
UNII	9HK5L7YBBR
CompTox Dashboard (EPA)	DTXSID8060452
- InChI: InChI=1S/C6H5I/c7-6-4-2-1-3-5-6/h1-5H Key: SNHMUERNLJLMHN-UHFFFAOYSA-N; InChI=1/C6H5I/c7-6-4-2-1-3-5-6/h1-5H Key: SNHMUERNLJLMHN-UHFFFAOYAQ
- SMILES: c1ccc(cc1)I

Properties
Chemical formula	C_{6}H_{5}I
Molar mass	204.010 g·mol^{−1}
Appearance	colorless liquid
Density	1.823 g/cm^{3}
Melting point	−29 °C (−20 °F; 244 K)
Boiling point	188 °C (370 °F; 461 K)
Solubility in water	Insoluble
log P	3
Magnetic susceptibility (χ)	−92.00·10^{−6} cm^{3}/mol
Viscosity	1.5042 mPa·s (300.65 K)

Hazards
Flash point	74.44 °C (165.99 °F; 347.59 K)

Thermochemistry
Heat capacity (C)	0.779 J/K

Related compounds
Related halobenzenes	Fluorobenzene; Chlorobenzene; Bromobenzene; Astatobenzene
- Except where otherwise noted, data are given for materials in their standard state (at 25 °C [77 °F], 100 kPa). verify (what is ?) Infobox references

Iodobenzene is an aryl iodide and the simplest of the iodobenzenes, consisting of a benzene ring substituted with one iodine atom. Its chemical formula is C_{6}H_{5}I. It is useful as a synthetic intermediate in organic chemistry. It is a volatile colorless liquid, although aged samples appear yellowish.

== Preparation ==
Iodobenzene is commercially available, or it can be prepared in the laboratory from aniline via the diazotization reaction. In the first step, the amine functional group is diazotized with hydrochloric acid and sodium nitrite. Potassium iodide is added to the resultant phenyldiazonium chloride, causing nitrogen gas to evolve. The product is separated by steam distillation.

Alternatively, it can be produced by refluxing iodine and nitric acid with benzene.

== Reactions ==
Since the C–I bond is weaker than C–Br or C–Cl, iodobenzene is more reactive than bromobenzene or chlorobenzene. Iodobenzene reacts readily with magnesium to form the Grignard reagent, phenylmagnesium iodide. Phenylmagnesium iodide, like the bromide analog, is a synthetic equivalent for the phenyl anion synthon. Iodobenzene reacts with chlorine to give the complex, iodobenzene dichloride, which is used as a solid source of chlorine.

Iodobenzene can also serve as a substrate for the Sonogashira coupling, Heck reaction, and other metal-catalyzed couplings. These reactions proceed via the oxidative addition of iodobenzene.
