= Copper fluoride =

Copper fluoride may refer to:

- Copper(I) fluoride (cuprous fluoride, CuF).
- Copper(II) fluoride (cupric fluoride, CuF_{2}).
