= Chlorobenzene =

Aromatic organochlorine compound

Chlorobenzene
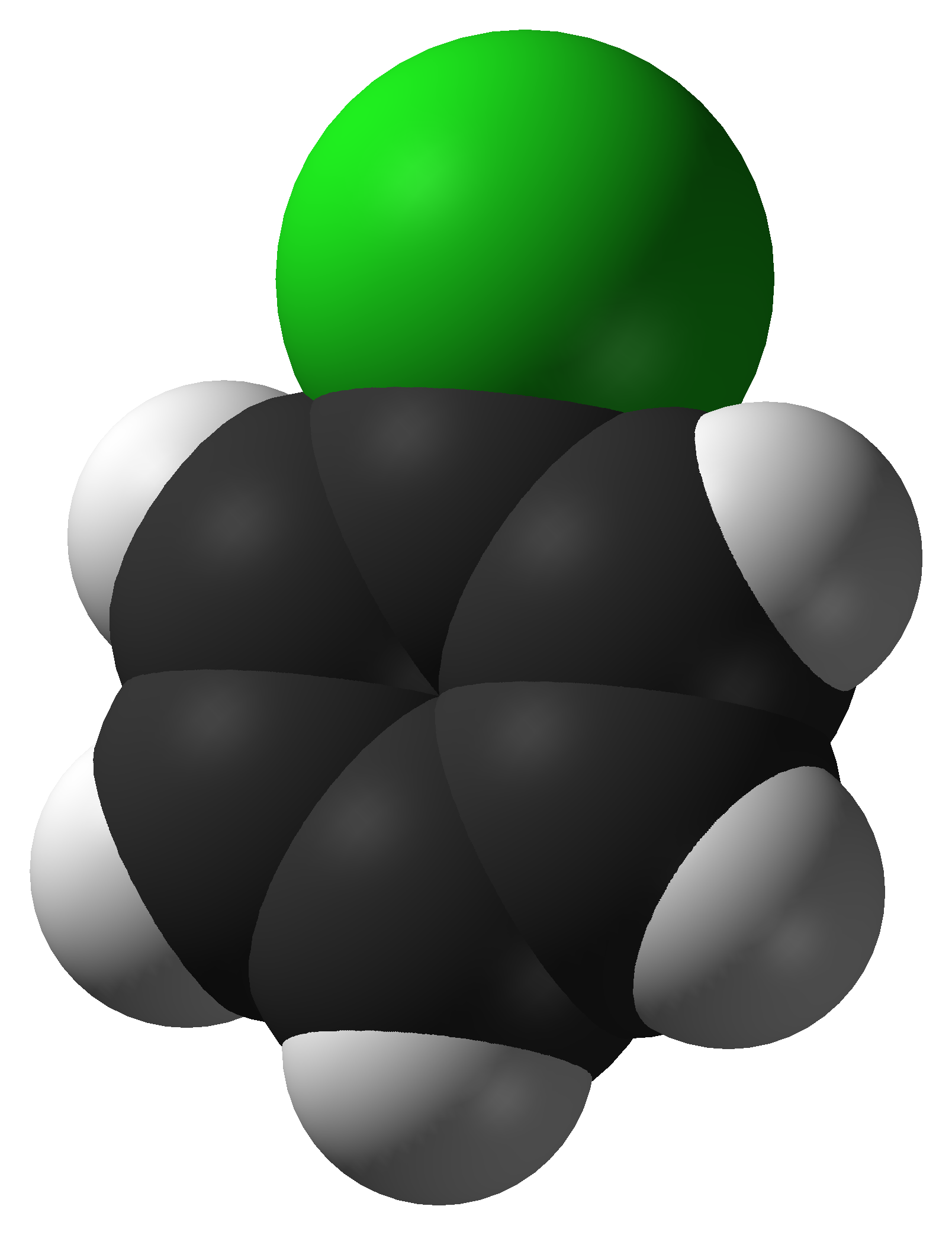
Chlorobenzene
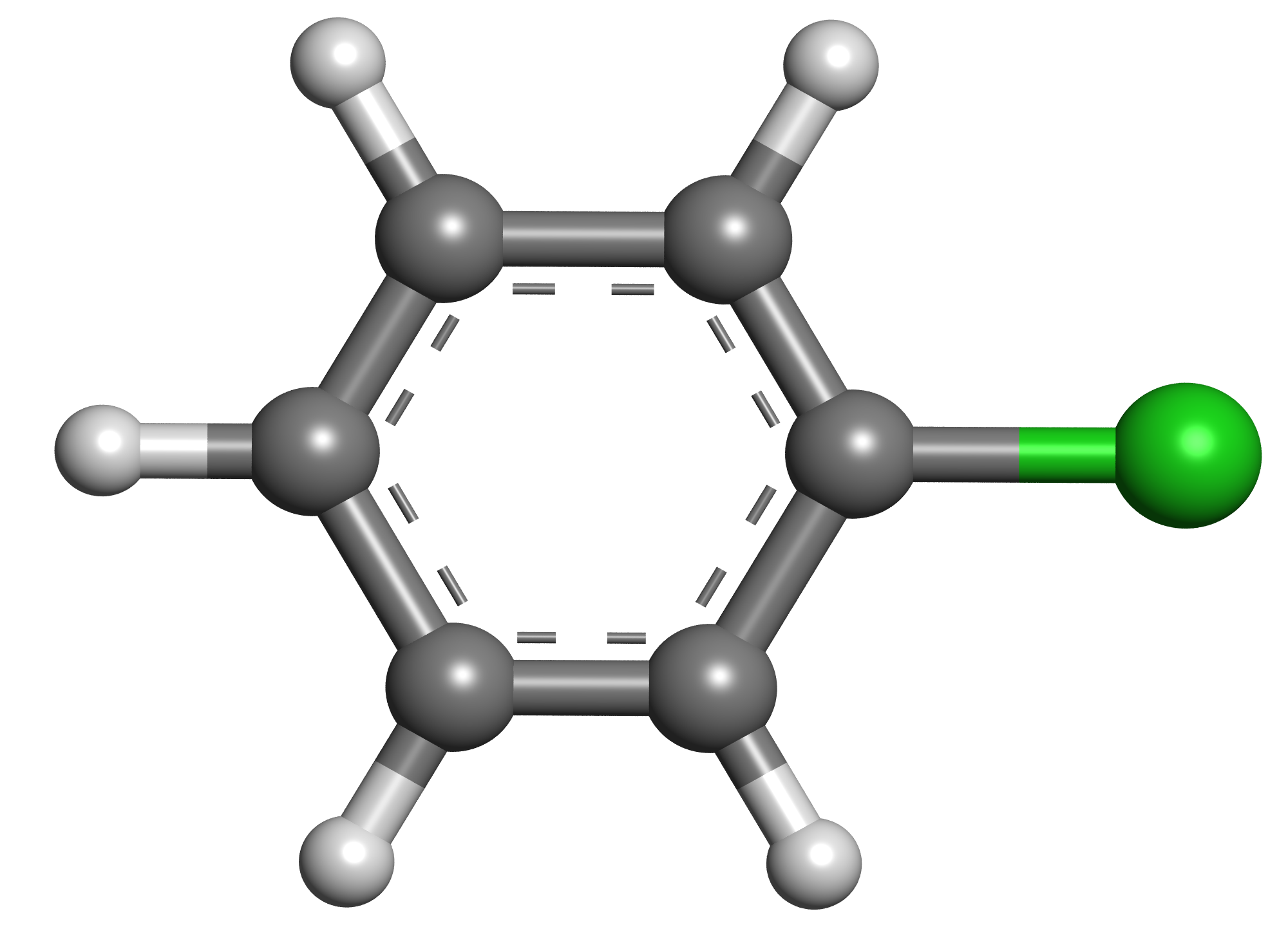

Names
- Preferred IUPAC name Chlorobenzene
- Other names Phenyl chloride, monochlorobenzene

Identifiers
CAS Number	108-90-7
3D model (JSmol)	Interactive image
Abbreviations	PhCl
Beilstein Reference	605632
ChEBI	CHEBI:28097
ChEMBL	ChEMBL16200
ChemSpider	7676
ECHA InfoCard	100.003.299
EC Number	203-628-5
Gmelin Reference	26704
KEGG	C06990
PubChem CID	7964
RTECS number	CZ0175000
UNII	K18102WN1G
UN number	1134
CompTox Dashboard (EPA)	DTXSID4020298
- InChI: InChI=1S/C6H5Cl/c7-6-4-2-1-3-5-6/h1-5H Key: MVPPADPHJFYWMZ-UHFFFAOYSA-N; InChI=1/C6H5Cl/c7-6-4-2-1-3-5-6/h1-5H Key: MVPPADPHJFYWMZ-UHFFFAOYAG
- SMILES: Clc1ccccc1

Properties
Chemical formula	C_{6}H_{5}Cl
Molar mass	112.56 g·mol^{−1}
Appearance	colorless liquid
Odor	almond-like
Density	1.11 g/cm^{3}, liquid
Melting point	−45.58 °C (−50.04 °F; 227.57 K)
Boiling point	131.70 °C (269.06 °F; 404.85 K)
Solubility in water	0.5 g l^{−1} in water at 20 °C
Solubility in other solvents	soluble in most organic solvents
Vapor pressure	9 mmHg
Magnetic susceptibility (χ)	−69.97·10^{−6} cm^{3}/mol
Refractive index (n_{D})	1.52138
Viscosity	0.7232

Hazards
- Occupational safety and health (OHS/OSH)
Main hazards	Low to moderate hazard
- GHS labelling
Pictograms	(GHS02: Flammable) (GHS07: Exclamation mark) (GHS09: Environmental hazard)
Signal word	Warning
Hazard statements	H226, H302, H305, H315, H332, H411
Precautionary statements	P210, P233, P240, P241, P242, P243, P261, P264, P271, P273, P280, P302+P352, P303+P361+P353, P304+P312, P304+P340, P312, P321, P332+P313, P362, P370+P378, P391, P403+P235, P501
NFPA 704 (fire diamond)	2 3 0
Flash point	29 °C (84 °F; 302 K)
Explosive limits	1.3%–9.6%
- Lethal dose or concentration (LD, LC)
LD_{50} (median dose)	2290 mg/kg (rat, oral) 590 mg/kg (mouse, orally); 2250 mg/kg (rabbit, oral); 2300 mg/kg (mouse, oral); 2250 mg/kg (guinea pig, oral)
LC_{Lo} (lowest published)	8000 ppm (cat, 3 hr)
- NIOSH (US health exposure limits)
PEL (Permissible)	TWA 75 ppm (350 mg/m^{3})
REL (Recommended)	none
IDLH (Immediate danger)	1000 ppm

Related compounds
Related Halobenzenes	Astatobenzene; Fluorobenzene; Bromobenzene; Iodobenzene
Related compounds	benzene; 1,4-dichlorobenzene

Supplementary data page
- Chlorobenzene (data page)
- Except where otherwise noted, data are given for materials in their standard state (at 25 °C [77 °F], 100 kPa). verify (what is ?) Infobox references

Chlorobenzene (abbreviated PhCl) is an aryl chloride and the simplest of the chlorobenzenes, consisting of a benzene ring substituted with one chlorine atom. Its chemical formula is C_{6}H_{5}Cl. This colorless, flammable liquid is a common solvent and a widely used intermediate in the manufacture of other chemicals.

== Uses ==
The major use of chlorobenzene is as a precursor for further intermediates such as nitrophenols, nitroanisole, chloroaniline, and phenylenediamines, which are used in the production of herbicides, dyestuffs, chemicals for rubber, and pharmaceuticals.

It is also used as a high-boiling solvent in industrial and laboratory applications, for materials such as oils, waxes, resins, and rubber.

Chlorobenzene is nitrated on a large scale to give a mixture of 2-nitrochlorobenzene and 4-nitrochlorobenzene, which are separated and used as intermediates in production of other chemicals. These mononitrochlorobenzenes are converted to related 2-nitrophenol, 2-nitroanisole, bis(2-nitrophenyl)disulfide, and 2-nitroaniline by nucleophilic displacement of the chloride, with respectively sodium hydroxide, sodium methoxide, sodium disulfide, and ammonia. The conversions of the 4-nitro derivative are similar.

=== Niche and former uses ===
Chlorobenzene once was used in the manufacture of pesticides, most notably DDT, by reaction with chloral (trichloroacetaldehyde), but this application has declined with the diminished use of DDT. At one time, chlorobenzene was the main precursor for the manufacture of phenol:

C_{6}H_{5}Cl + NaOH → C_{6}H_{5}OH + NaCl

The reaction is known as the Dow process, with the reaction carried out at 350 °C using fused sodium hydroxide without solvent. Labeling experiments show that the reaction proceeds via elimination/addition, through benzyne as the intermediate.

== Production ==
It was first described in 1851. Chlorobenzene is manufactured by chlorination of benzene in the presence of a catalytic amount of Lewis acid such as ferric chloride, sulfur dichloride, and aluminium chloride:

Industrially the reaction is conducted as a continuous process to minimize the formation of dichlorobenzenes. Because chlorine is electronegative, C_{6}H_{5}Cl exhibits somewhat decreased susceptibility toward further chlorination.

=== Laboratory routes ===
Chlorobenzene could be produced from aniline via benzenediazonium chloride, otherwise known as the Sandmeyer reaction.

== Safety ==
Chlorobenzene exhibits "low to moderate" toxicity as indicated by its LD_{50} of 2.9 g/kg. The Occupational Safety and Health Administration has set a permissible exposure limit at 75 ppm (350 mg/m^{3}) over an eight-hour time-weighted average for workers handling chlorobenzene.

== Toxicology and biodegradation ==
Chlorobenzene can persist in soil for several months, in air for about 3.5 days, and in water for less than one day. Humans may be exposed to this agent via breathing contaminated air (primarily via occupational exposure), consuming contaminated food or water, or by coming into contact with contaminated soil (typically near hazardous waste sites). However, because it has only been found at 97 out of 1,177 NPL hazardous waste sites, it is not considered a widespread environmental contaminant. The bacterium Rhodococcus phenolicus degrades chlorobenzene, dichlorobenzene and phenol as sole carbon sources.

Upon entering the body, typically via contaminated air, chlorobenzene is excreted both via the lungs and the urinary system.

== On other planets ==
Chlorobenzene has been detected in a sedimentary rock on Mars. It was speculated that the chlorobenzene might have been produced when the sample was heated in the instrument sampling chamber. The heating would have triggered a reaction of organics in the Martian soil, which is known to contain perchlorate.
