= Trihalide =

Class of chemical compounds

The molecular structure of chloroform, one of the simplest trihalides.

A trihalide in chemistry is an organohalide consisting of three halide atoms bonded to a single atom or compound. An example of a trihalide is chloroform.

The trihalomethanes are the simplest trihalides, because only one hydrogen is connected to the carbon. The 1,1,1-Trichloroethane is one of the trihalides of ethane.

== See also ==
- Fluoroform
- Bromoform
- Iodoform
