= Bromobenzene =

Chemical compound

Structure of bromobenzene
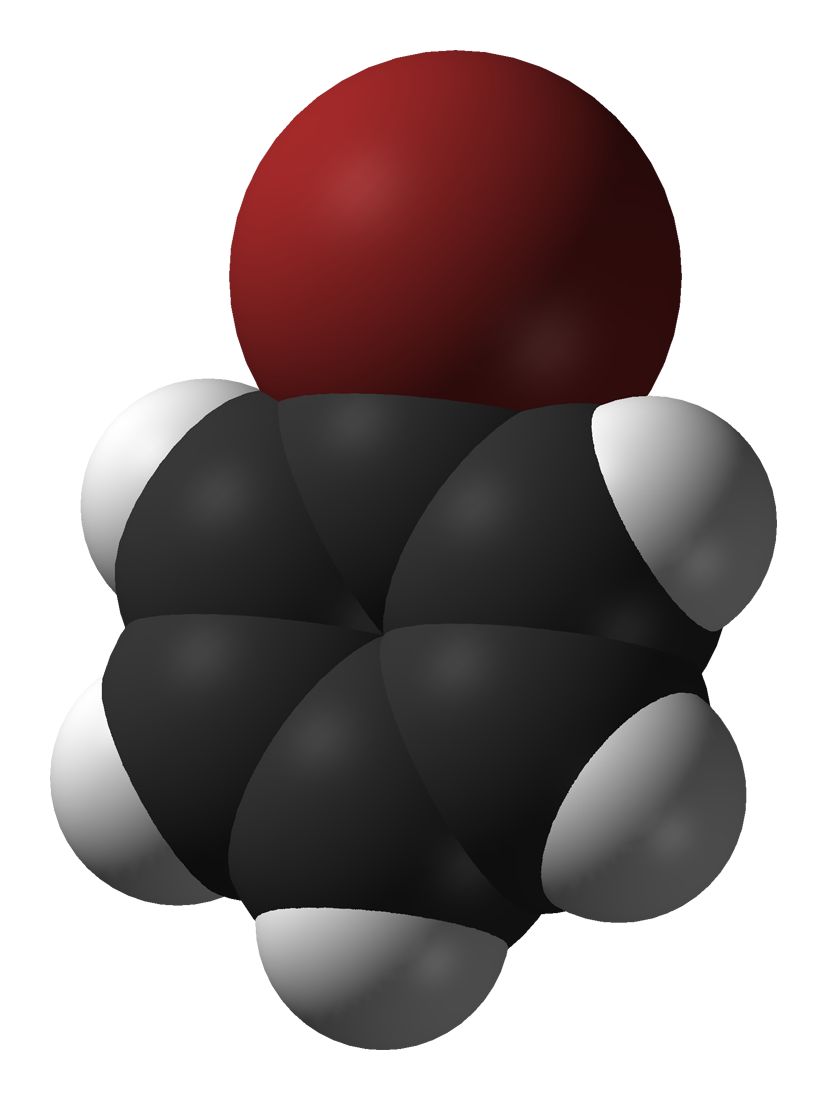
Space-filling model of bromobenzene

Names
- Preferred IUPAC name Bromobenzene
- Other names Phenyl Bromide; Bromobenzol; Monobromobenzene

Identifiers
CAS Number	108-86-1
3D model (JSmol)	Interactive image
Abbreviations	PhBr
Beilstein Reference	1236661
ChEBI	CHEBI:3179
ChEMBL	ChEMBL16068
ChemSpider	7673
ECHA InfoCard	100.003.295
EC Number	203-623-8
KEGG	C11036
PubChem CID	7961
RTECS number	CY9000000
UNII	CO4D5J547L
UN number	2514
CompTox Dashboard (EPA)	DTXSID5024637
- InChI: InChI=1S/C6H5Br/c7-6-4-2-1-3-5-6/h1-5H Key: QARVLSVVCXYDNA-UHFFFAOYSA-N; InChI=1/C6H5Br/c7-6-4-2-1-3-5-6/h1-5H Key: QARVLSVVCXYDNA-UHFFFAOYAB
- SMILES: c1ccc(cc1)Br

Properties
Chemical formula	C_{6}H_{5}Br
Molar mass	157.010 g·mol^{−1}
Appearance	Colourless liquid
Odor	Pleasant aromatic odor
Density	1.495 g cm^{−3}, liquid
Melting point	−30.8 °C (−23.4 °F; 242.3 K)
Boiling point	156 °C (313 °F; 429 K)
Solubility in water	0.041 g/100 mL
Solubility	soluble in diethyl ether, alcohol, CCl_{4} miscible in chloroform, benzene, petroleum ether
Vapor pressure	4.18 mm Hg
Magnetic susceptibility (χ)	−78.92·10^{−6} cm^{3}/mol
Refractive index (n_{D})	1.5602
Viscosity	1.080 mPa·s at 25 °C; 1.124 mPa·s at 20 °C

Hazards
- GHS labelling
Pictograms	(GHS02: Flammable) (GHS07: Exclamation mark) (GHS09: Environmental hazard)
Signal word	Warning
Hazard statements	H226, H315, H411
Precautionary statements	P210, P233, P240, P241, P242, P243, P264, P273, P280, P302+P352, P303+P361+P353, P321, P332+P313, P362, P370+P378, P391, P403+P235, P501
NFPA 704 (fire diamond)	2 2 0
Flash point	51 °C (124 °F; 324 K)
Autoignition temperature	565 °C (1,049 °F; 838 K)

Related compounds
Related halobenzenes	Fluorobenzene; Chlorobenzene; Iodobenzene; Astatobenzene
- Except where otherwise noted, data are given for materials in their standard state (at 25 °C [77 °F], 100 kPa). verify (what is ?) Infobox references

Bromobenzene is an aryl bromide and the simplest of the bromobenzenes, consisting of a benzene ring substituted with one bromine atom. Its chemical formula is C_{6}H_{5}Br. It is a colourless liquid although older samples can appear yellow. It is a reagent in organic synthesis.

== Synthesis and reactions ==
Bromobenzene is prepared by the action of bromine on benzene in the presence of Lewis acid catalysts such as aluminium chloride or ferric bromide.

Bromobenzene is used to introduce a phenyl group into other compounds. One method involves its conversion to the Grignard reagent, phenylmagnesium bromide. This reagent can be used, e.g. in the reaction with carbon dioxide to prepare benzoic acid. Other methods involve palladium-catalyzed coupling reactions, such as the Suzuki reaction. Bromobenzene is used as a precursor in the manufacture of phencyclidine.

== Toxicity ==
Animal tests indicate low toxicity. Little is known about chronic effects.

For liver toxicity, the 3,4-epoxide is a proposed intermediate.
