= Organoastatine chemistry =

Study of the carbon-astatine bond

Organoastatine chemistry describes the synthesis and properties of organoastatine compounds, chemical compounds containing a carbon to astatine chemical bond.

Astatine is extremely radioactive, with the longest-lived isotope (^{210}At) having a half-life of only 8.1 hours. Consequently, organoastatine chemistry can only be studied by tracer techniques on extremely small quantities. The problems caused by radiation damage as well as difficulties in separation and identification are worse for organic astatine derivatives than for inorganic compounds. Most studies of organoastatine chemistry focus on ^{211}At (half-life 7.21 hours), which is the subject of ongoing studies in nuclear medicine: it is better than ^{131}I at destroying abnormal thyroid tissue.

Astatine-labelled iodine reagents have been used to synthesise RAt, RAtCl_{2}, R_{2}AtCl, and RAtO_{2} (R = phenyl or p-tolyl). Alkyl and aryl astatides are relatively stable and have been analysed at high temperatures (120 °C) with radio gas chromatography. Demercuration reactions have produced with good yields trace quantities of ^{211}At-containing aromatic amino acids, steroids, and imidazoles, among other compounds.

Astatine has both halogen-like and metallic properties, so that analogies with iodine sometimes hold, but sometimes do not. Astatine can be incorporated into organic molecules via halogen exchange, halodediazotation (replacing a diazonium group), halodeprotonation, or halodemetallation. Initial attempts to radiolabel proteins with ^{211}At exemplify its intermediate behaviour, as astatination (analogous to radioiodination) produces unstable results and it is instead AtO^{+} (or a hydrolysed species) that probably bonds to proteins. Two-step procedures are used today, first synthesising stable astatoaryl prosthetic groups before incorporating them into the protein. Not only is the C–At bond the weakest of all carbon–halogen bonds (following periodic trends), but also the bond easily breaks as the astatine is oxidised back to free astatine.
