= Fluorobenzene =

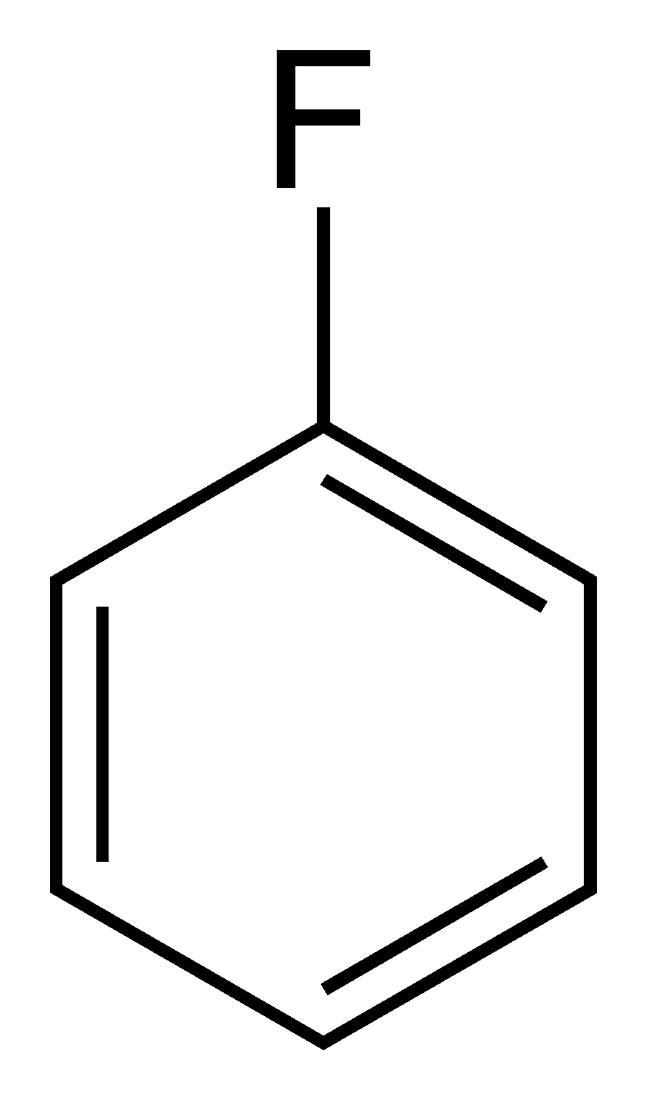
Structure of fluorobenzene
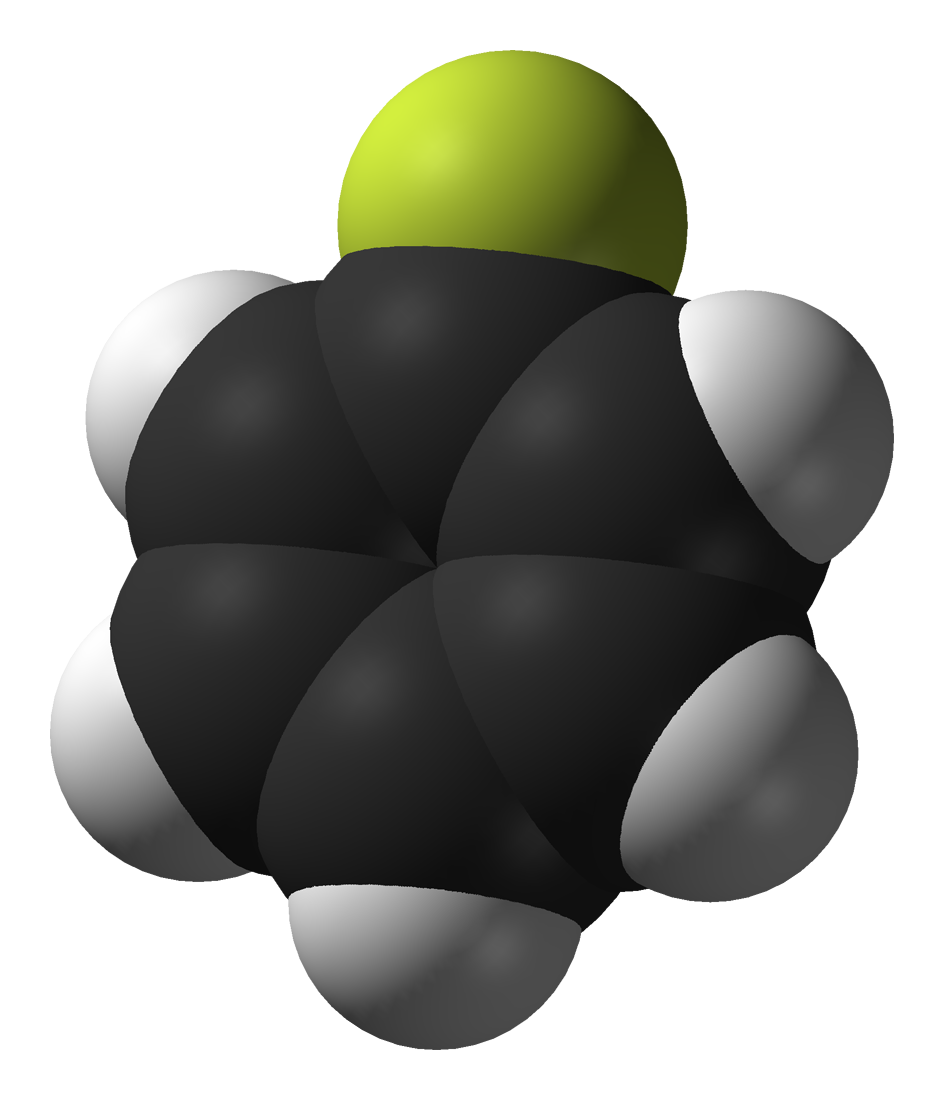
Space-filling model of fluorobenzene

Names
- Preferred IUPAC name Fluorobenzene
- Other names Phenyl fluoride Monofluorobenzene

Identifiers
CAS Number	462-06-6
3D model (JSmol)	Interactive image
Abbreviations	PhF
Beilstein Reference	1236623
ChEBI	CHEBI:5115
ChEMBL	ChEMBL16070
ChemSpider	9614
ECHA InfoCard	100.006.657
EC Number	207-321-7
Gmelin Reference	49856
KEGG	C11272
PubChem CID	10008
UNII	G3TSZ68K12
UN number	2387
CompTox Dashboard (EPA)	DTXSID4025329
- InChI: InChI=1S/C6H5F/c7-6-4-2-1-3-5-6/h1-5H Key: PYLWMHQQBFSUBP-UHFFFAOYSA-N; InChI=1/C6H5F/c7-6-4-2-1-3-5-6/h1-5H Key: PYLWMHQQBFSUBP-UHFFFAOYAM
- SMILES: Fc1ccccc1

Properties
Chemical formula	C_{6}H_{5}F
Molar mass	96.104 g·mol^{−1}
Appearance	Colorless liquid
Density	1.025 g/mL, liquid
Melting point	−44 °C (−47 °F; 229 K)
Boiling point	84 to 85 °C (183 to 185 °F; 357 to 358 K)
Solubility in water	low
Magnetic susceptibility (χ)	−58.4·10^{−6} cm^{3}/mol
Refractive index (n_{D})	1.46553

Structure
Molecular shape	Planar

Hazards
- GHS labelling
Pictograms	(GHS02: Flammable) (GHS05: Corrosive) (GHS07: Exclamation mark)
Signal word	Warning
Hazard statements	H225, H318, H411
Precautionary statements	P210, P233, P240, P241, P242, P243, P264, P273, P280, P303+P361+P353, P305+P351+P338, P310, P337+P313, P370+P378, P391, P403+P235, P501
NFPA 704 (fire diamond)	1 3 0

Related compounds
Related halobenzenes	Chlorobenzene; Bromobenzene; Iodobenzene; Astatobenzene
Related compounds	Benzene; 1,2-Difluorobenzene
- Except where otherwise noted, data are given for materials in their standard state (at 25 °C [77 °F], 100 kPa). verify (what is ?) Infobox references

Fluorobenzene is an aryl fluoride and the simplest of the fluorobenzenes, with the formula C_{6}H_{5}F, often abbreviated PhF. A colorless liquid, it is a precursor to many fluorophenyl compounds.

== Preparation ==
PhF was first reported in 1886 by O. Wallach at the University of Bonn, who prepared the compound in two steps. Phenyldiazonium chloride was first converted to a triazene using piperidine:

[PhN_{2}]Cl + 2 (CH_{2})_{5}NH → PhN=N-N(CH_{2})_{5} + [(CH_{2})_{5}NH_{2}]Cl

The triazine was then cleaved with hydrofluoric acid:

PhN=N-N(CH_{2})_{5} + 2 HF → PhF + N_{2} + [(CH_{2})_{5}NH_{2}]F

On the laboratory scale, PhF is prepared by the thermal decomposition of the benzenediazonium tetrafluoroborate:

PhN_{2}BF_{4} → PhF + BF_{3} + N_{2}

According to the procedure, solid [PhN_{2}]BF_{4} is heated with a flame to initiate an exothermic reaction, which also affords boron trifluoride and nitrogen gas. Product PhF and BF_{3} are readily separated because of their differing boiling points.

The technical synthesis is by the reaction of cyclopentadiene with difluorocarbene. The initially formed cyclopropane undergoes a ring expansion and subsequent elimination of hydrogen fluoride.

== Reactions ==
PhF behaves rather differently from other halobenzene derivatives owing to the pi-donor properties of fluoride. For example, the para position is more activated than benzene toward electrophiles. For this reason, it can be converted to 1-bromo-4-fluorobenzene with relatively high efficiency.

== Solvent properties ==
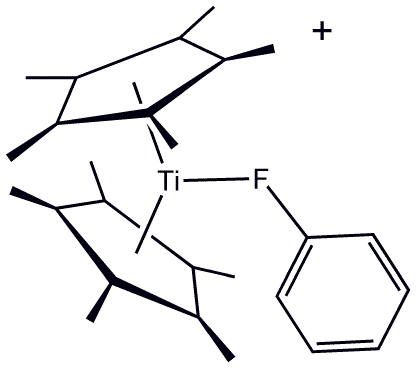
Structure of [(C_{5}Me_{5})_{2}Ti(FC_{6}H_{5})]^{+}, a coordination complex of fluorobenzene.

PhF is a useful solvent for highly reactive species. Its melting point at −44 °C is lower than that of benzene. In contrast, the boiling points of PhF and benzene are very similar, differing by only 4 °C. It is considerably more polar than benzene, with a dielectric constant of 5.42 compared to 2.28 for benzene at 298 K. Fluorobenzene is a relatively inert compound reflecting the strength of the C–F bond.

Although it is usually considered a non-coordinating solvent, a metal complex of PhF has been crystallized.

== See also ==
- Pentafluoromethylbenzene
