= Nitrobenzenes =

Nitrobenzenes are a group of nitro compounds consisting of one or more nitro groups as substituents on a benzene core. They have the formula C_{6}H_{6–n}(NO_{2})_{n}, where n = 1–6 is the number of nitro groups. Depending on the number of nitro groups, there may be several constitutional isomers possible.

- Mononitrobenzene
- Dinitrobenzene
  - 1,2-Dinitrobenzene
  - 1,3-Dinitrobenzene
  - 1,4-Dinitrobenzene
- Trinitrobenzene
  - 1,2,3-Trinitrobenzene
  - 1,2,4-Trinitrobenzene
  - 1,3,5-Trinitrobenzene
- Tetranitrobenzene
  - 1,2,3,4-Tetranitrobenzene
  - 1,2,3,5-Tetranitrobenzene
  - 1,2,4,5-Tetranitrobenzene
- Pentanitrobenzene
- Hexanitrobenzene
