= C6H4N2O4 =

The molecular formula C_{6}H_{4}N_{2}O_{4} (molar mass: 168.11 g/mol, exact mass: 168.0171 u) may refer to:

- Dinitrobenzenes
  - 1,2-Dinitrobenzene
  - 1,3-Dinitrobenzene
  - 1,4-Dinitrobenzene
