= Azoxy compounds =

Chemical compound of the form R–N=N(–O)–R

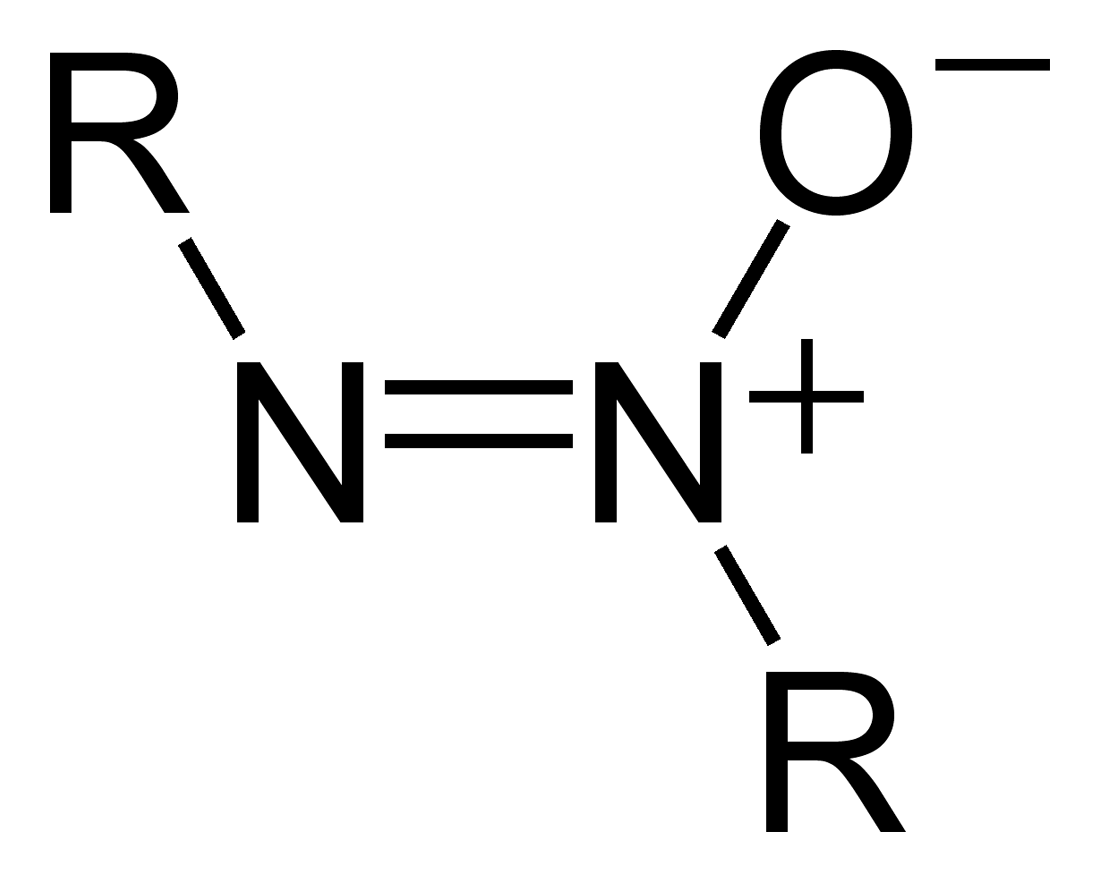
The structure of the azoxy functional group, where R is a substituent.

In chemistry, azoxy compounds are a group of organic compounds sharing a common functional group with the general structure R−N=N^{+}(−O^{−})−R. They are considered N-oxides of azo compounds. Azoxy compounds are 1,3-dipoles and cycloadd to double bonds. Most azoxy-containing compounds have aryl substituents.

== Preparation ==
Azoxybenzene and its derivatives are typically prepared by reduction of nitro compounds, such as the reduction of nitrobenzene with arsenous oxide. Such reactions are proposed to proceed via the intermediacy of the nitroso compounds and hydroxylamines, e.g. phenylhydroxylamine and nitrosobenzene (Ph = phenyl, C_{6}H_{5}):
$$\ce{PhNHOH  +  PhNO  ->  PhN(O)NPh  +  H2O}$$

Nitrosocarbamate esters decarboxylate in strong base to an azotate susceptible to strong alkylation agents:

–N(H)CO_{2}R + [NO]^{+}[NO_{3}]^{−} → –N(N=O)CO_{2}R + HNO_{3}
–N(N=O)CO_{2}R + KOR → –N=NO^{−}K^{+} + CO_{2} + R_{2}O
–N=NO^{−}K^{+} + R_{3}O^{+}BF^{−}_{4} → –N(N=O)R + R_{2}O + KBF_{4}

An alternative route involves oxidation of azobenzenes with peroxy acids.

== Structure ==
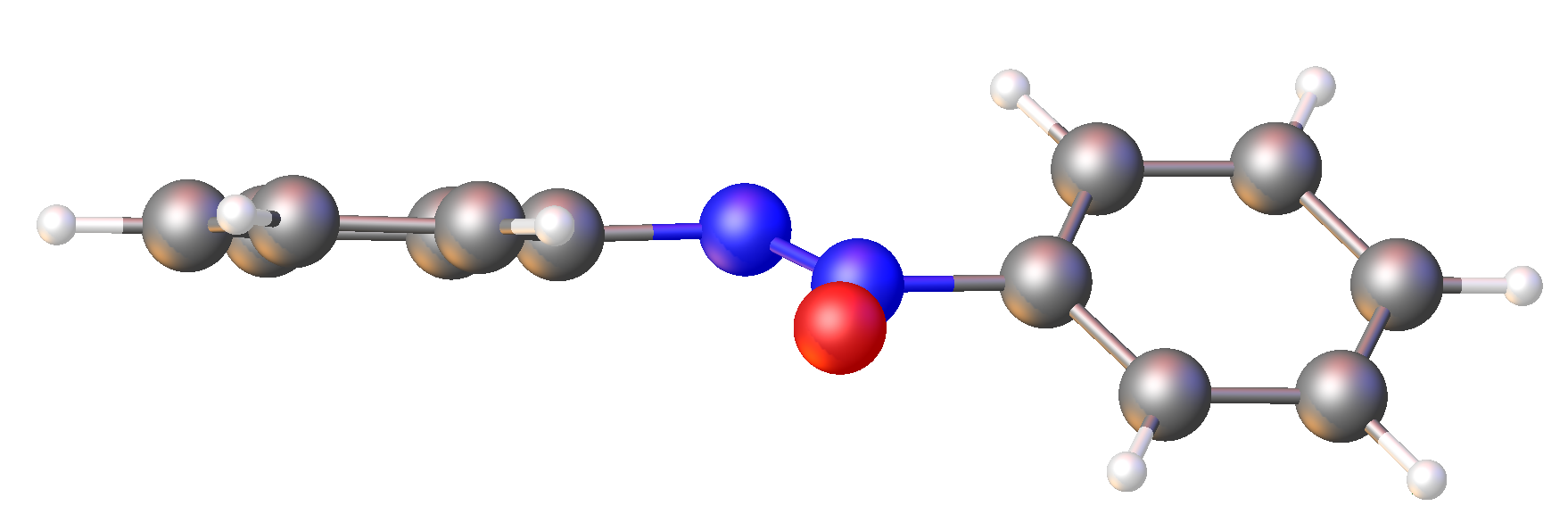
Structure of azoxybenzene as determined by X-ray crystallography.

Azoxybenzene compounds are more stable as their trans isomer isomer. In Ph_{2}N_{2}O, the N-N and N-O bond lengths are is 1.24 and 1.255 Å respectively, corresponding to some double bonds character. The CNNC and CNNO are near 176°.

trans-Azoxydibenzene's resonance form with a negative formal charge on oxygen (–N=N^{+}(O^{−})–) corresponds to a theoretical 6‑D dipole moment. However, the observed moment is only 4.7 D, suggesting a substantial resonance contribution in which the other nitrogen bears negative charge (–N^{−}–N^{+}(=O)–).

== Reactions ==
Under ultraviolet light transazobenzene compounds isomerize to their cis isomers, analogous to azobenzene. Similar reaction conditions can instead cause isomery to an ortho-azophenol, or migration of the oxygen atom across the two nitrogens.

Unlike azo compounds, azoxy compounds do not fragment thermally to lose nitrous oxide; the process is believed forbidden by orbital symmetries. Correspondingly, the reaction is possible under UV light with wavelength approximately 220 nm.

The azoxy group is electron-withdrawing, but in non-oxidizing media, aliphatic α hydrogens must be situated between two azoxy groups to appreciably dissociate. Alkyllithia replace the hydrogens, but with reduction:

–N^{+}(O^{−})=NC(H)< + 2LiR → –N=NC(R)< + Li_{2}O↓ + RH

Basic oxidants abstract α hydrogens in a free-radical process, leading to dimerization.

Azoxyarenes ortho to a benzylic carbon with good leaving group eliminate the leaving group to give an indazolone (the Davis-Beirut reaction).

Azoxy compounds are weak bases, and unstable to strong acids. In acids, azoxyarenes undergo the Wallach rearrangement to para-azophenols; primary and secondary azoxyaliphates tautomerize to a hydrazamide.

The two aryl groups in azoxyarenes undergo electrophilic aromatic substitution differently. In the case of azoxybenzene, PhNN(O)– reacts at the meta position, while PhN(O)N– reacts at the ortho and para positions.

Electrochemical reduction converts azoxyarenes to azo compounds. Single-electron reductants give a deep-blue radical anion, which dimerizes in aqueous solution to the corresponding azo compound and hydrogen peroxide. Strong reducing agents such as lithium aluminum hydride also hydrogenolyze electronegative ortho or para arene substituents, but catalytic hydrogenation selects out the azoxy link. Conversely, sodium borohydride preserves the azoxy group even as it reduces arene substituents.

== Safety ==
Alkyl azoxy compounds, e.g. azoxymethane are suspected to be genotoxic.

== See also ==
- azobenzene dioxide
