= C6H3N3O6 =

The molecular formula C_{6}H_{3}N_{3}O_{6} (molar mass: 213.10 g/mol, exact mass: 213.0022 u) may refer to:

- 1,2,3-Trinitrobenzene
- 1,3,5-Trinitrobenzene
