= Nitrobenzene =

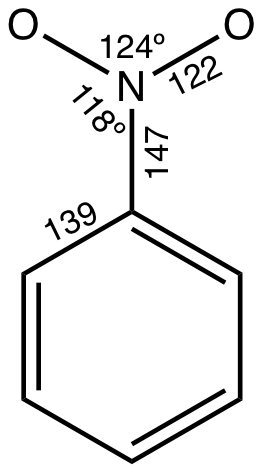
Nitrobenzene, distances in picometers
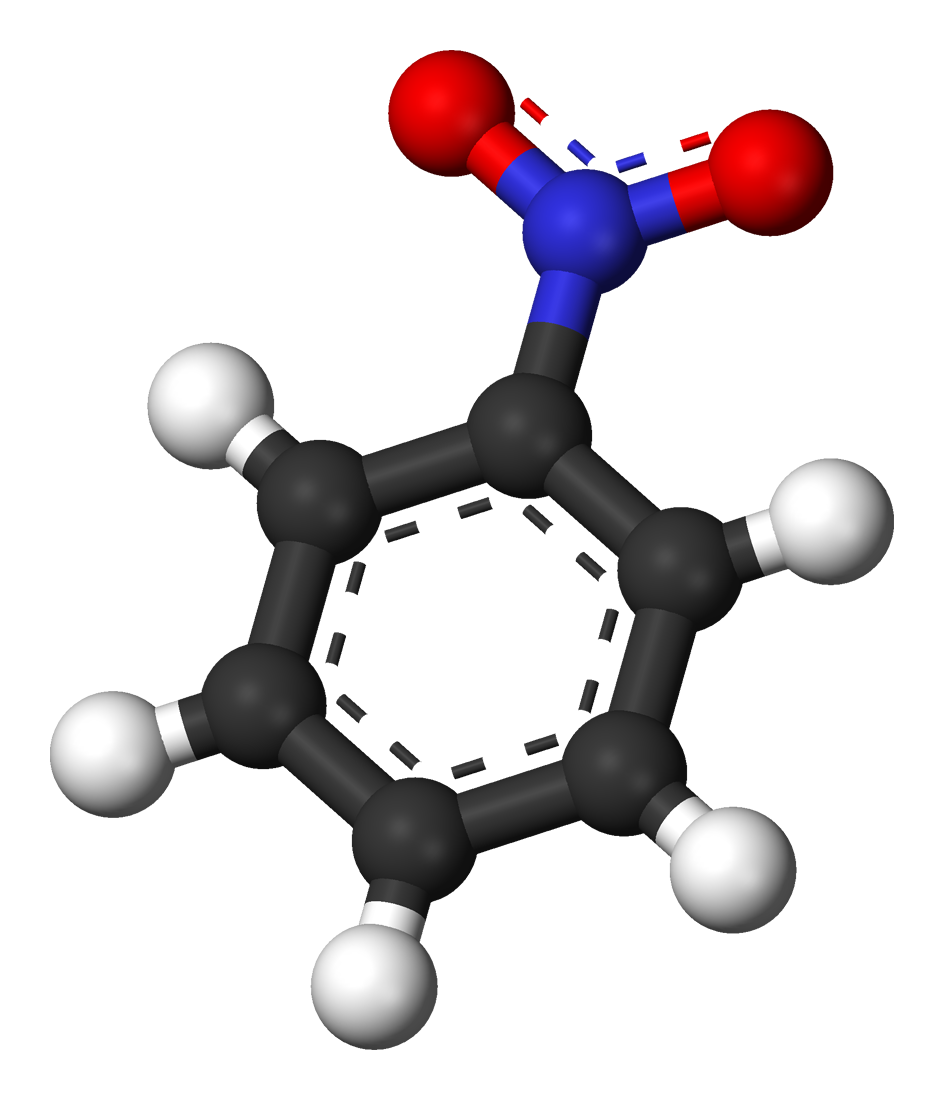
Nitrobenzene
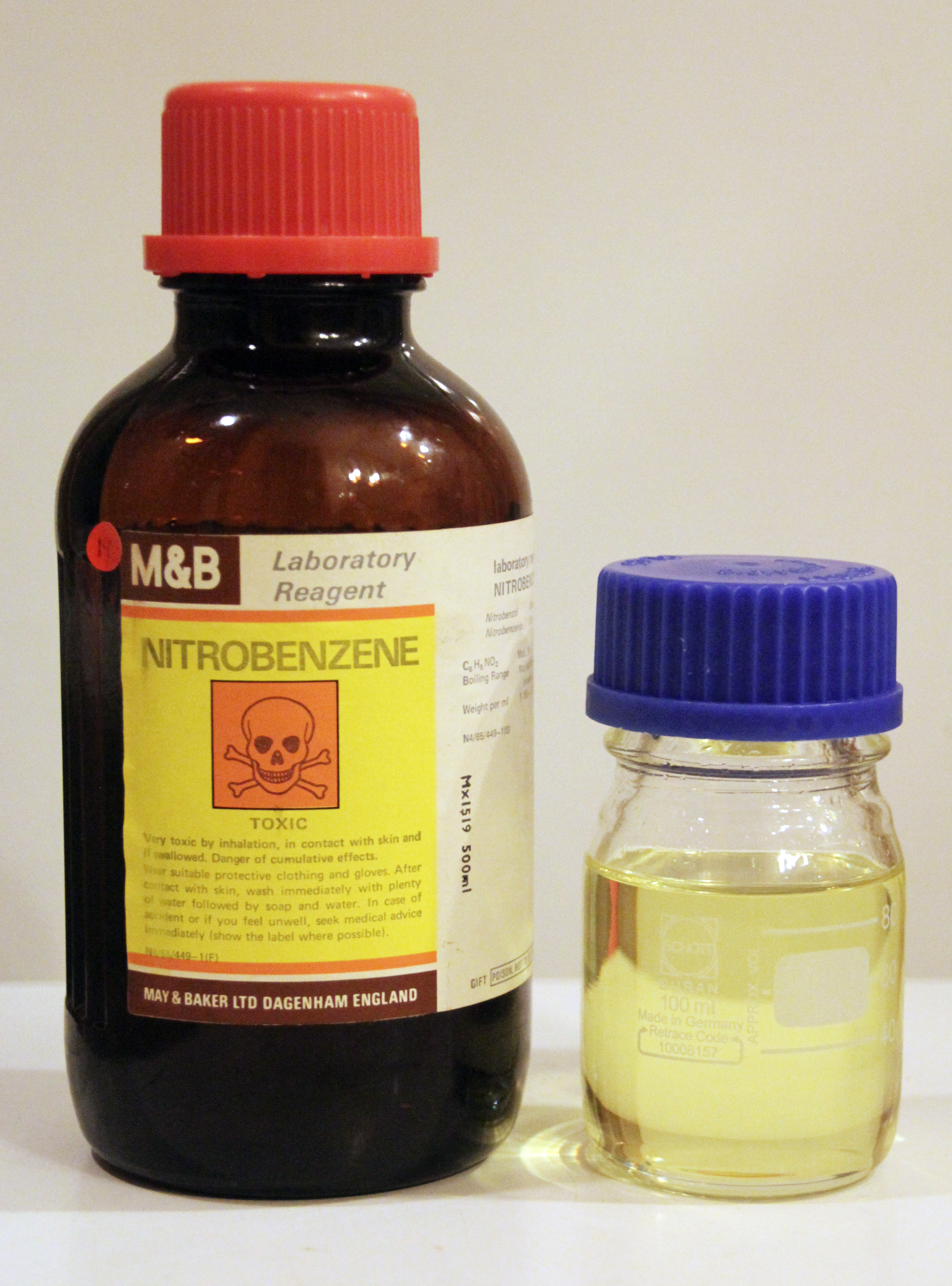

Names
- Preferred IUPAC name Nitrobenzene
- Other names Nitrobenzol; Nitritebenzene; Oil of mirbane

Identifiers
CAS Number	98-95-3
3D model (JSmol)	Interactive image
Abbreviations	PhNO_{2}
Beilstein Reference	507540
ChEBI	CHEBI:27798
ChEMBL	ChEMBL15750
ChemSpider	7138
ECHA InfoCard	100.002.469
EC Number	202-716-0
Gmelin Reference	50357
KEGG	C06813
PubChem CID	7416
RTECS number	DA6475000
UNII	E57JCN6SSY
CompTox Dashboard (EPA)	DTXSID3020964
- InChI: InChI=1S/C6H5NO2/c8-7(9)6-4-2-1-3-5-6/h1-5H Key: LQNUZADURLCDLV-UHFFFAOYSA-N; InChI=1/C6H5NO2/c8-7(9)6-4-2-1-3-5-6/h1-5H Key: LQNUZADURLCDLV-UHFFFAOYAA
- SMILES: c1ccc(cc1)[N+](=O)[O-]

Properties
Chemical formula	C_{6}H_{5}NO_{2}
Molar mass	123.111 g·mol^{−1}
Appearance	yellowish, oily liquid
Odor	pungent, like paste shoe polish to almond-like
Density	1.199 g/cm^{3}
Melting point	5.7 °C (42.3 °F; 278.8 K)
Boiling point	210.9 °C (411.6 °F; 484.0 K)
Solubility in water	0.19 g/100 ml at 20 °C
Vapor pressure	0.3 mmHg (25°C)
Magnetic susceptibility (χ)	−61.80·10^{−6} cm^{3}/mol
Refractive index (n_{D})	1.5215
Viscosity	1.8112 mPa·s

Hazards
- GHS labelling
Pictograms	(GHS06: Toxic) (GHS08: Health hazard)
Signal word	Danger
Hazard statements	H301, H311, H331, H351, H360, H372, H412
Precautionary statements	P201, P202, P260, P264, P270, P271, P273, P280, P281, P301+P310, P302+P352, P304+P340, P308+P313, P311, P312, P314, P321, P322, P330, P361, P363, P403+P233, P405, P501
NFPA 704 (fire diamond)	3 2 1
Flash point	88 °C (190 °F; 361 K)
Autoignition temperature	480 °C (896 °F; 753 K)
Explosive limits	1.8%-?
- Lethal dose or concentration (LD, LC)
LD_{50} (median dose)	780 mg/kg (rat, oral); 600 mg/kg (rat, oral); 590 mg/kg (mouse, oral)
LD_{Lo} (lowest published)	750 mg/kg (dog, oral)
- NIOSH (US health exposure limits)
PEL (Permissible)	TWA 1 ppm (5 mg/m^{3}) [skin]
REL (Recommended)	TWA 1 ppm (5 mg/m^{3}) [skin]
IDLH (Immediate danger)	200 ppm

Related compounds
Related compounds	Aniline; Benzenediazonium chloride Nitrosobenzene
- Except where otherwise noted, data are given for materials in their standard state (at 25 °C [77 °F], 100 kPa). verify (what is ?) Infobox references

Nitrobenzene is an aromatic nitro compound and the simplest of the nitrobenzenes, with the chemical formula C_{6}H_{5}NO_{2}. It is a water-insoluble pale yellow oil with an almond-like odor. It freezes to give greenish-yellow crystals. It is produced on a large scale from benzene as a precursor to aniline. In the laboratory, it is occasionally used as a solvent, especially for electrophilic reagents. As confirmed by X-ray crystallography, nitrobenzene is a planar molecule.

== Production ==
Nitrobenzene is prepared by nitration of benzene with a mixture of concentrated sulfuric acid, water, and nitric acid. This mixture is sometimes called "mixed acid."

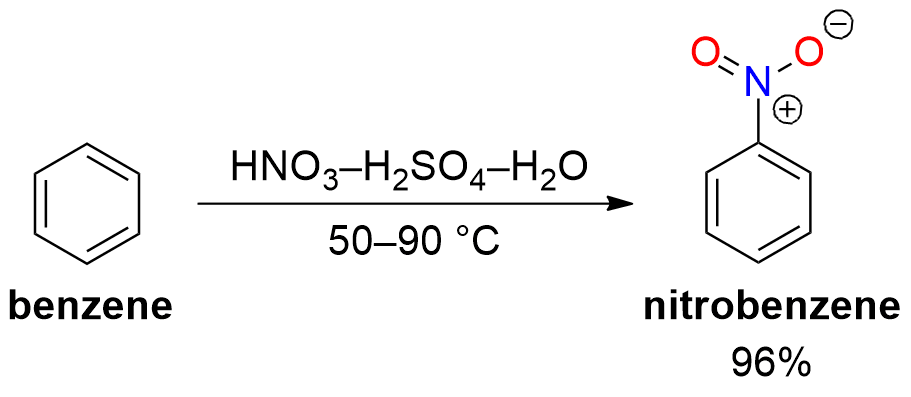

The production of nitrobenzene is one of the most dangerous processes conducted in the chemical industry because of the exothermicity of the reaction (ΔH = −117 kJ/mol).

The nitration process involves formation of the nitronium ion (NO_{2}^{+}), followed by an electrophilic aromatic substitution reaction of it with benzene. The nitronium ion is generated by the reaction of nitric acid and an acidic dehydration agent, typically sulfuric acid:

HNO_{3} + H^{+} ⇌ NO_{2}^{+} + H_{2}O

World capacity for nitrobenzene in 1985 was about 1,700,000 tonnes.

== Uses ==
Approximately 95% of nitrobenzene industrially produced is hydrogenated to aniline:

C_{6}H_{5}NO_{2} + 3 H_{2} → C_{6}H_{5}NH_{2} + 2 H_{2}O

Aniline is a precursor to urethane polymers, rubber chemicals, pesticides, dyes (particularly azo dyes), explosives, and pharmaceuticals.

Most aniline is consumed in the production of methylenedianiline, a precursor to polyurethanes.

=== Specialized applications ===
Nitrobenzene is used to mask unpleasant odors in shoe and floor polishes, leather dressings, paint solvents, and other materials. Redistilled, as oil of mirbane, nitrobenzene had been used as an inexpensive perfume for soaps. It has been replaced by less toxic chemicals for this purpose. A significant merchant market for nitrobenzene is its use in the production of the analgesic paracetamol (also known as acetaminophen). Nitrobenzene is also used in Kerr cells, as it has an unusually large Kerr constant. Evidence suggests its use in agriculture as a plant growth/flowering stimulant.

Historically, nitrobenzene was used by the Provisional Irish Republican Army to make improvised explosive devices during The Troubles, specially after the British Army raids cut off their supplies of explosives in the early 1970s.

== Chemical properties ==
=== Electrophilic substitution ===
Nitrobenzene can be further nitrated using a mixture of concentrated HNO_{3} and H_{2}SO_{4} to produce 1,3-dinitrobenzene (1,3-DNB) as a major product. Typical byproducts of the reaction are 1,2-dinitrobenzene (1,2-DNB), 1,4-dinitrobenzene (1,4-DNB) and 4-nitrophenol (4-NP).

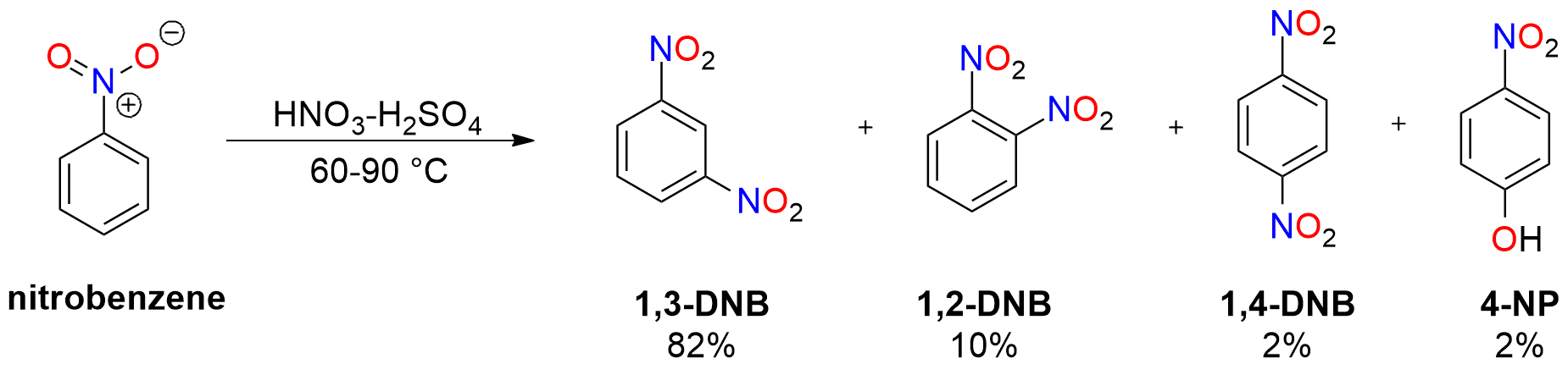

Sulfonation of nitrobenzene with 65% fuming sulfuric acid gives 3-nitrobenzenesulfonic acid (3-NBSA). Usually 3-NBSA is not isolated in a form of a free acid, the reaction mass is quenched and converted to the sodium salt of 3-NBSA.

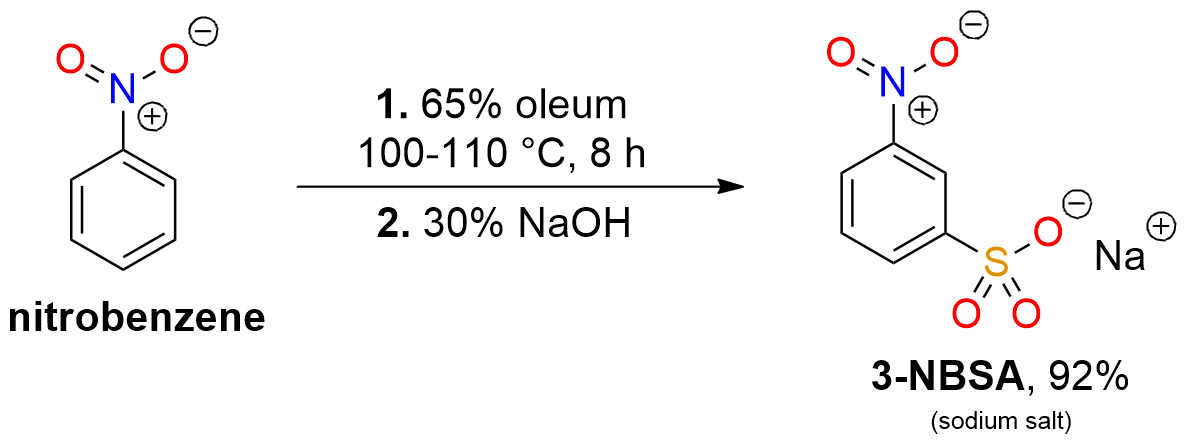

Nitrobenzene chlorination in the presence of FeCl_{3} yields a mixture that predominantly contains 3-nitrochlorobenzene (3-NCB) and small amount of the other isomers: 2-nitrochlorobenzene (2-NCB) and 4-nitrochlorobenzene (4-NCB).

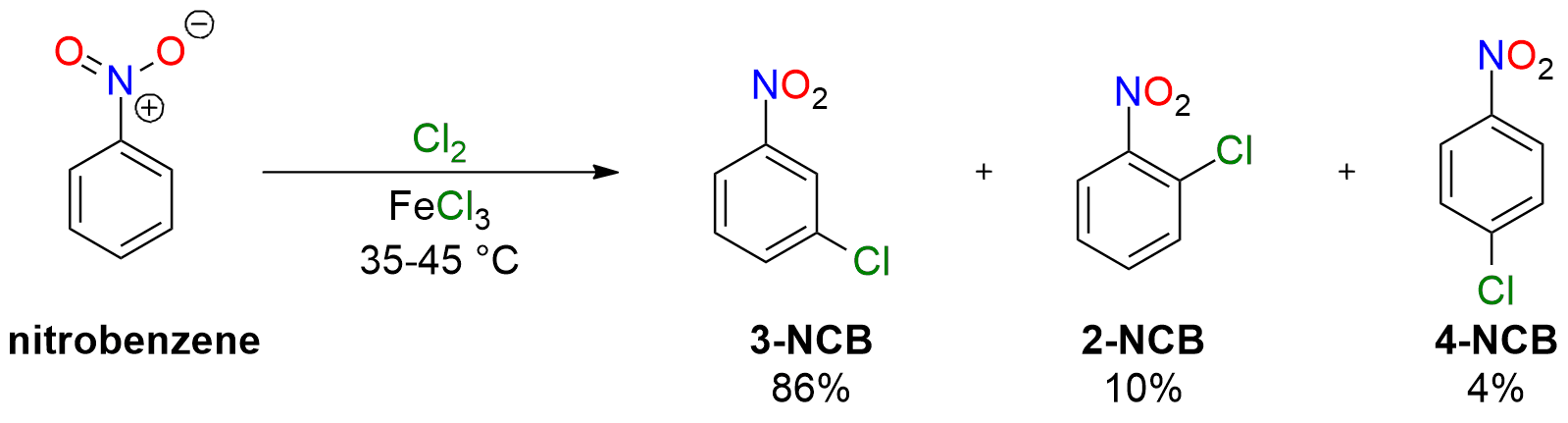

=== Other organic reactions ===
Aside from its conversion to aniline, nitrobenzene can be selectively reduced to azoxybenzene, azobenzene, nitrosobenzene, hydrazobenzene, and phenylhydroxylamine. It has been used as a mild oxidant in reactions like the Skraup quinoline synthesis.

== Safety ==
Nitrobenzene is toxic (Threshold Limit Value 5 mg/m^{3}) and readily absorbed through the skin.

Prolonged exposure may cause serious damage to the central nervous system, impair vision, cause liver or kidney damage, anemia and lung irritation.

Nitrobenzene is considered a likely human carcinogen by the United States Environmental Protection Agency, and is classified by the IARC as a Group 2B carcinogen which is "possibly carcinogenic to humans". It has been shown to cause liver, kidney, and thyroid adenomas and carcinomas in rats.

It is classified as an extremely hazardous substance in the United States as defined in Section 302 of the U.S. Emergency Planning and Community Right-to-Know Act (42 U.S.C. 11002), and is subject to strict reporting requirements by facilities which produce, store, or use it in significant quantities.
