= TNBA =

TNBA may refer to:

- The New Batman Adventures, an animated television series
- The Nottingham Bluecoat Academy
- 2,4,6-Trinitrobenzoic acid, a chemical compound
