= C12H10N2O2 =

The molecular formula C_{12}H_{10}N_{2}O_{2} (molar mass: 214.22 g/mol) may refer to:

- 2-Nitrodiphenylamine
- Azobenzene dioxide
