= Streptomyces gelaticus =

Scientific classification
- Domain: Bacteria
- Kingdom: Bacillati
- Phylum: Actinomycetota
- Class: Actinomycetia
- Order: Streptomycetales
- Family: Streptomycetaceae
- Genus: Streptomyces
- Species: S. gelaticus

Binomial name
- Streptomyces gelaticus (Waksman 1923) Waksman and Henrici 1948 (Approved Lists 1980)

Type strain
- AS 4.1444, ATCC 23912, ATCC 3323, BCRC 11477, Bu 7,1, BUCSAV 7 ,1, CBS 131.20, CBS 369.39, CBS 833.68, CCM 3177, CCRC 11477, CGMCC 4.1444, DSM 40065, ETH 10211, ETH 16702, IFO 12866, IMET 40285, IMRU 3323, ISP 5065, JCM 4376, KCC S-0376, Lanoot R-8745, LMG 19376, NBRC 12866, NCIMB 9848, NRRL B-1252, NRRL B-2928, NRRL-ISP 5065, PSA 95, R-8745, RIA 1118, RIA 89, RV 71485, VKM Ac-1704, WC 3323

Synonyms
- "Actinomyces gelaticus" Waksman 1923

Species of bacterium

Streptomyces gelaticus is a bacterium species from the genus of Streptomyces which has been isolated from soil. Streptomyces gelaticus produces maculosin 1, Cyclo(tyrorosylpropyl) and elaiomycin.

== See also ==
- List of Streptomyces species
