= Trinitrobenzene =

Trinitrobenzenes are nitrobenzenes consisting of three nitro groups bonded to a central benzene ring.

There are three isomers of trinitrobenzene:

- 1,2,3-Trinitrobenzene
- 1,2,4-Trinitrobenzene
- 1,3,5-Trinitrobenzene
