= Azoxybenzene =

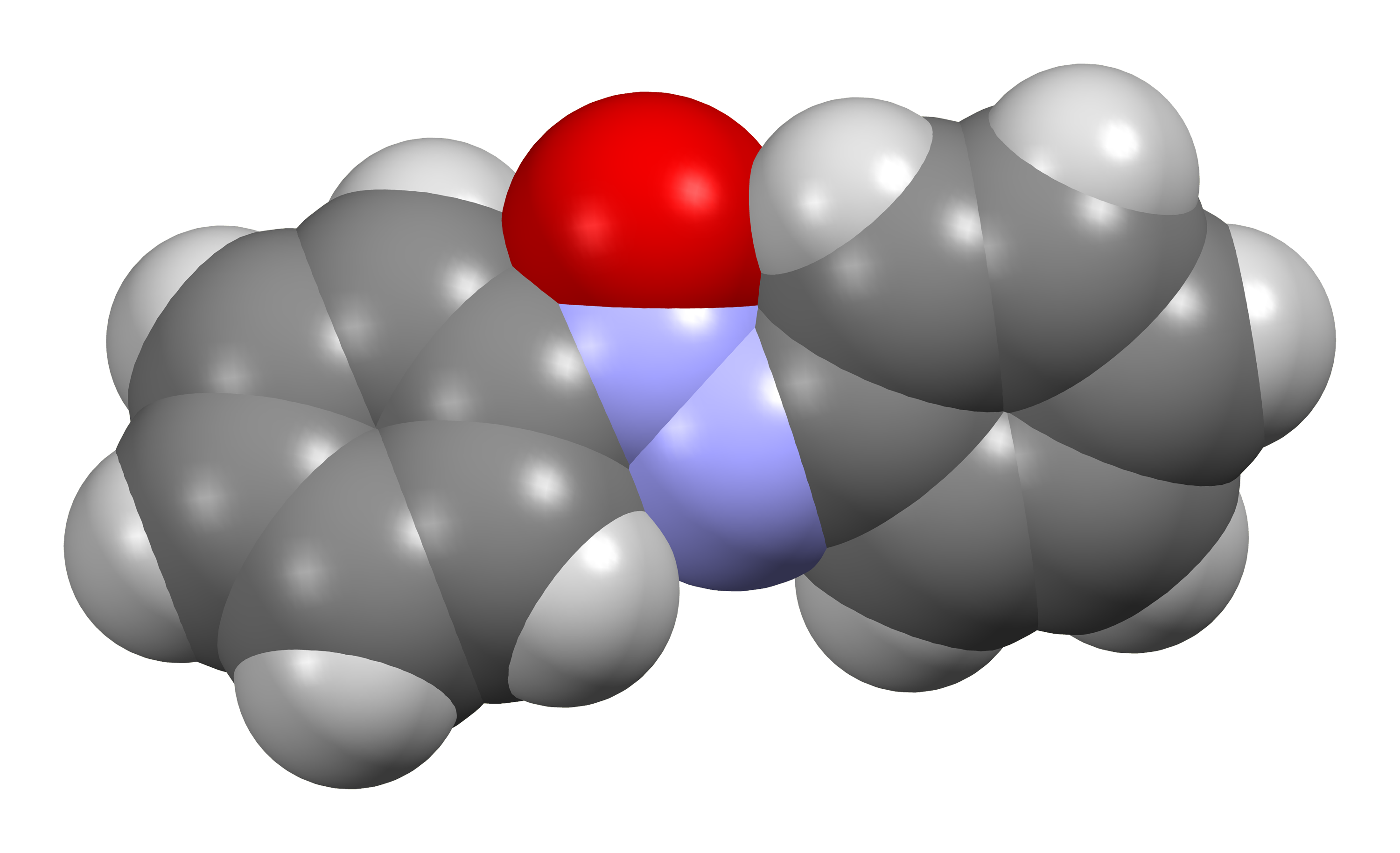

Names
- Preferred IUPAC name Diphenyldiazene oxide
- Other names Azoxybenzene; 1-Oxo-1,2-diphenyl-1λ^{5}-diazene (Diphenyldiazeniumyl)oxidanide (Z)-1,2-Diphenyldiazene 1-oxide [(Z)-Phenyl-NNO-azoxy]benzene; Fenazox

Identifiers
CAS Number	495-48-7
3D model (JSmol)	Interactive image
Beilstein Reference	743984
ChEBI	CHEBI:51865
ChEMBL	ChEMBL1442921
ChemSpider	10446022
ECHA InfoCard	100.007.094
EC Number	207-802-1
PubChem CID	10316
UNII	X2K99TM19Q
CompTox Dashboard (EPA)	DTXSID0024555
- InChI: InChI=1S/C12H10N2O/c15-14(12-9-5-2-6-10-12)13-11-7-3-1-4-8-11/h1-10H Key: GAUZCKBSTZFWCT-UHFFFAOYSA-N
- SMILES: C1=CC=C(C=C1)N=[N+](C2=CC=CC=C2)[O-]

Properties
Chemical formula	C_{12}H_{10}N_{2}O
Molar mass	198.225 g·mol^{−1}
Appearance	yellow solid
Density	1.318 g/cm^{3}
Melting point	35.5–36.5 °C (95.9–97.7 °F; 308.6–309.6 K)

Hazards
- GHS labelling
Pictograms	(GHS07: Exclamation mark)
Signal word	Warning
Hazard statements	H302, H332
Precautionary statements	P261, P264, P270, P271, P301+P317, P304+P340, P317, P330, P501
- Except where otherwise noted, data are given for materials in their standard state (at 25 °C [77 °F], 100 kPa). Infobox references

Azoxybenzene is organic compound with the formula C_{6}H_{5}N(O)NC_{6}H_{5}. It is a yellow, low-melting solid. The molecule has a planar C_{2}N_{2}O core. The N-N and N-O bond lengths are nearly the same at 1.23 Å.

== Preparation ==
It can be prepared by partial reduction of nitrobenzene. This reaction is proposed to proceed via the intermediacy of phenylhydroxylamine and nitrosobenzene:

PhNHOH + PhNO → PhN(O)NPh + H_{2}O

Another option is the oxidation of aniline by hydrogen peroxide, in acetonitrile at 50 °C. In this reaction, the pH should be kept around 8, to activate the hydrogen peroxide and avoid too much oxygen evolution at the same time. First, the acetonitrile is oxidized, forming an imine hydroperoxide. Then, this intermediate oxidizes the aniline to azoxybenzene.

CH_{3}CN + H_{2}O_{2} → [CH_{3}C(OOH)=NH]
2 PhNH_{2} + 3 [CH_{3}C(OOH)=NH] → PhN(O)NPh + 3 CH_{3}C(O)NH_{2} + 2 H_{2}O
PhNO2 + Na_{3}AsO_{3}/NaOH→ Ph−N^{+}O^{−}=N-Ph
