= Elaiomycin =

Names
- IUPAC name (2S,3S)-(3-Hydroxy-1-methoxybutan-2-yl)imino-[(E)-oct-1-enyl]-oxidoazanium

Identifiers
CAS Number	23315-05-1
3D model (JSmol)	Interactive image
ChemSpider	16735790
PubChem CID	6141900
UNII	227V1PL5TF
- InChI: InChI=1S/C13H26N2O3/c1-4-5-6-7-8-9-10-15(17)14-13(11-18-3)12(2)16/h9-10,12-13,16H,4-8,11H2,1-3H3/b10-9+,15-14? Key: BCPWSYQGYBTINM-HDHZNLKHSA-N
- SMILES: CCCCCC/C=C\[N+](=N\[C@@H](COC)[C@H](C)O)\[O-]

Properties
Chemical formula	C_{13}H_{26}N_{2}O_{3}
Molar mass	258.362 g·mol^{−1}
- Except where otherwise noted, data are given for materials in their standard state (at 25 °C [77 °F], 100 kPa). Infobox references

Elaiomycin is an antimicrobial chemical compound, classified as an conjugated azoxyalkene, which was first isolated from Streptomyces in 1954. A laboratory synthesis of elaiomycin was reported in 1977.

A variety related compounds, collectively called elaiomycins, have also been reported.
