= Dinitrobenzene =

Class of compounds

Dinitrobenzenes are nitrobenzenes composed of a benzene ring and two nitro group (-NO_{2}) substituents. The three possible arrangements of the nitro groups afford three isomers, 1,2-dinitrobenzene, 1,3-dinitrobenzene, and 1,4-dinitrobenzene. Each isomer has the chemical formula C_{6}H_{4}N_{2}O_{4} and a molar mass of about 168.11 g/mol. 1,3-Dinitrobenzene is the most common isomer. It is used as a precursor to 1,3-diaminobenzene and 3-nitroaniline.

== Properties ==
The dinitrobenzenes are all crystalline solids. The boiling points of the three isomers are relatively close; however, the melting points significantly differ. 1,4-Dinitrobenzene, which has the highest symmetry, has the highest melting point.

Dinitrobenzenes
| IUPAC name | 1,2-Dinitrobenzene | 1,3-Dinitrobenzene | 1,4-Dinitrobenzene |
| Other names | o-Dinitrobenzene | m-Dinitrobenzene | p-Dinitrobenzene |
| Chemical structure | | | |
| CAS number | 528-29-0 | 99-65-0 | 100-25-4 |
| CAS number | 25154-54-5 (Unspecified isomers) | | |
| PubChem | CID 10707 from PubChem | CID 7452 from PubChem | CID 7492 from PubChem |
| Chemical formula | C_{6}H_{4}N_{2}O_{4} | | |
| Molar mass | 168.11 g/mol | | |
| Magnetic Susceptibility | -65.98·10^{−6} cm^{3}/mol | -70.53·10^{−6} cm^{3}/mol | -68.30·10^{−6} cm^{3}/mol |
| Physical state | solid | | |
| Appearance | white solid | yellowish solid | pale yellow solid |
| Melting point | 118 °C | 89.6 °C | 174 °C |
| Boiling point | 318 °C | 297 °C | 299 °C |
| Density | 1.565 g/cm^{3} (17 °C) | 1.575 g/cm^{3} (18 °C) | 1.625 g/cm^{3} (18 °C) |
| Vapor pressure | 0.08 Pa (30 °C) | | 0.07 Pa (30 °C) |
| Vapor pressure | 0.34 Pa (50 °C) | | 0.23 Pa (50 °C) |
| Solubility | Insoluble in water | | |
| GHS hazards | | | |
| H phrases | H300, H310, H330, H373, H410 | | |
| P phrases | P260, P262, P264, P270, P271, P273, P280, P284, P301+P310, P302+P350, P304+P340, P310, P314, P320, P321, P330, P361, P363, P391, P403+P233, P405, P501 | | |
