= Azobenzene =

Two phenyl rings linked by a N=N double bond

- Skeletal formula of azobenzene

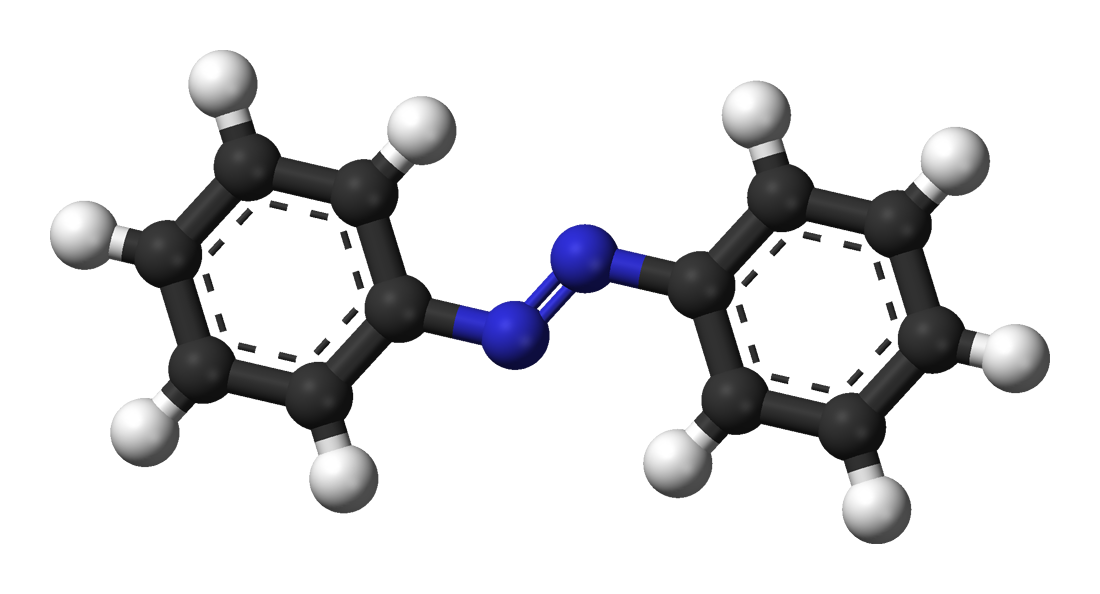
- Ball-and-stick model of azobenzene

Names
- IUPAC name (E)-Diphenyldiazene
- Other names Azobenzene

Identifiers
CAS Number	103-33-3
3D model (JSmol)	Interactive image
Beilstein Reference	742610
ChEBI	CHEBI:58996
ChEMBL	ChEMBL58835
ChemSpider	2185
ECHA InfoCard	100.002.820
EC Number	203-102-5
Gmelin Reference	83610
KEGG	C19334
PubChem CID	2272
RTECS number	CN1400000
UNII	F0U1H6UG5C
CompTox Dashboard (EPA)	DTXSID8020123
- InChI: InChI=1S/C12H10N2/c1-3-7-11(8-4-1)13-14-12-9-5-2-6-10-12/h1-10H/b14-13+ Key: DMLAVOWQYNRWNQ-BUHFOSPRSA-N; InChI=1/C12H10N2/c1-3-7-11(8-4-1)13-14-12-9-5-2-6-10-12/h1-10H/b14-13+ Key: DMLAVOWQYNRWNQ-BUHFOSPRBP
- SMILES: N(=N/c1ccccc1)\c2ccccc2

Properties
Chemical formula	C_{12}H_{10}N_{2}
Molar mass	182.226 g·mol^{−1}
Appearance	orange-red crystals
Density	1.203 g/cm^{3}
Melting point	67.88 °C (trans), 71.6 °C (cis)
Boiling point	300 °C (572 °F; 573 K)
Solubility in water	6.4 mg/L (25 °C)
Acidity (pK_{a})	−2.95 (conjugate acid)
Magnetic susceptibility (χ)	−106.8·10^{−6} cm^{3}/mol
Refractive index (n_{D})	1.6266 (589 nm, 78 °C)

Structure
Molecular shape	sp^{2} at N
Dipole moment	0 D (trans isomer)

Hazards
- Occupational safety and health (OHS/OSH)
Main hazards	toxic
- GHS labelling
Pictograms	(GHS07: Exclamation mark) (GHS08: Health hazard) (GHS09: Environmental hazard)
Signal word	Danger
Hazard statements	H302, H332, H341, H350, H373, H410
Precautionary statements	P201, P202, P260, P264, P270, P271, P273, P281, P301+P312, P304+P312, P304+P340, P308+P313, P312, P314, P330, P391, P405, P501
Flash point	476 °C (889 °F; 749 K)

Related compounds
Related compounds	Nitrosobenzene aniline
- Except where otherwise noted, data are given for materials in their standard state (at 25 °C [77 °F], 100 kPa). verify (what is ?) Infobox references

Azobenzene is a photoswitchable chemical compound composed of two phenyl rings linked by a N=N double bond. It is the simplest example of an aryl azo compound. The term "azobenzene" or simply "azo" is often used to refer to a wide class of similar compounds. These azo compounds are considered as derivatives of diazene (diimide), and are sometimes referred to as "diazenes". The diazenes absorb light strongly and are common dyes. Different classes of azo dyes exist, most notably the ones substituted with heteroaryl rings.

== Structure and synthesis ==
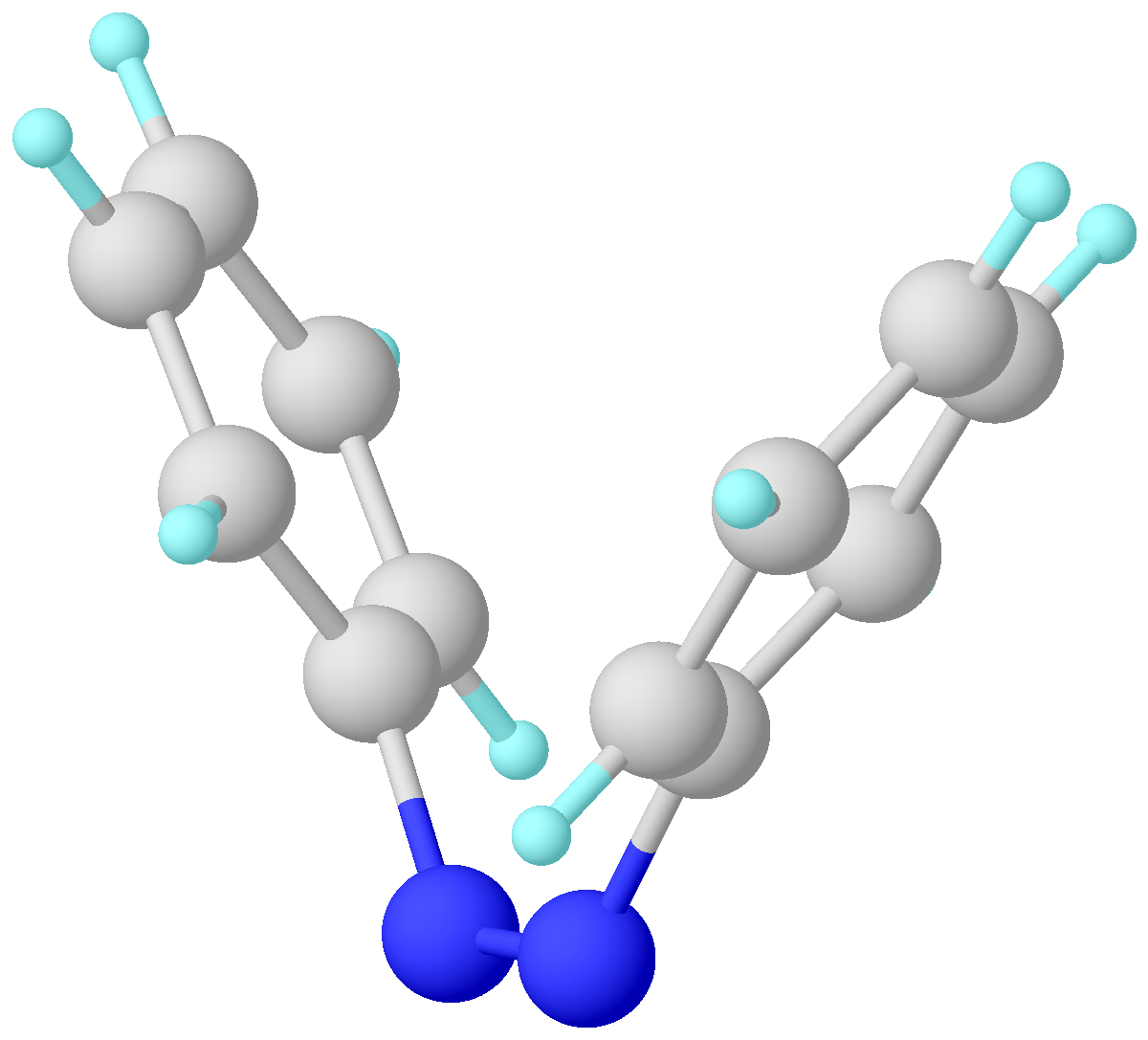
X-ray crystallography reveals the highly nonplanar, twisted structure for cis-azobenzene.

Azobenzene was first described by Eilhard Mitscherlich in 1834. Yellowish-red crystalline flakes of azobenzene were obtained in 1856. Its original preparation is similar to the modern one. According to the 1856 method, nitrobenzene is reduced by iron filings in the presence of acetic acid. In the modern synthesis, zinc is the reductant in the presence of a base. Industrial electrosynthesis using nitrobenzene is also employed.

trans-Azobenzene isomer is planar with an N-N distance of 1.189 Å. cis-Azobenzene is nonplanar with a C-N=N-C dihedral angle of 173.5° and an N-N distance of 1.251 Å. The trans isomer is more stable by approximately 50 kJ/mol, and the barrier to isomerization in the ground state is approximately 100 kJ/mol.

Azobenzene photoisomerization. The trans form (left) can be converted to the cis form (right) using a UV wavelength of 300–400 nm. Visible illumination at >400 nm converts the molecule back to the trans form. Alternately, the molecule will thermally relax to the stable trans form.

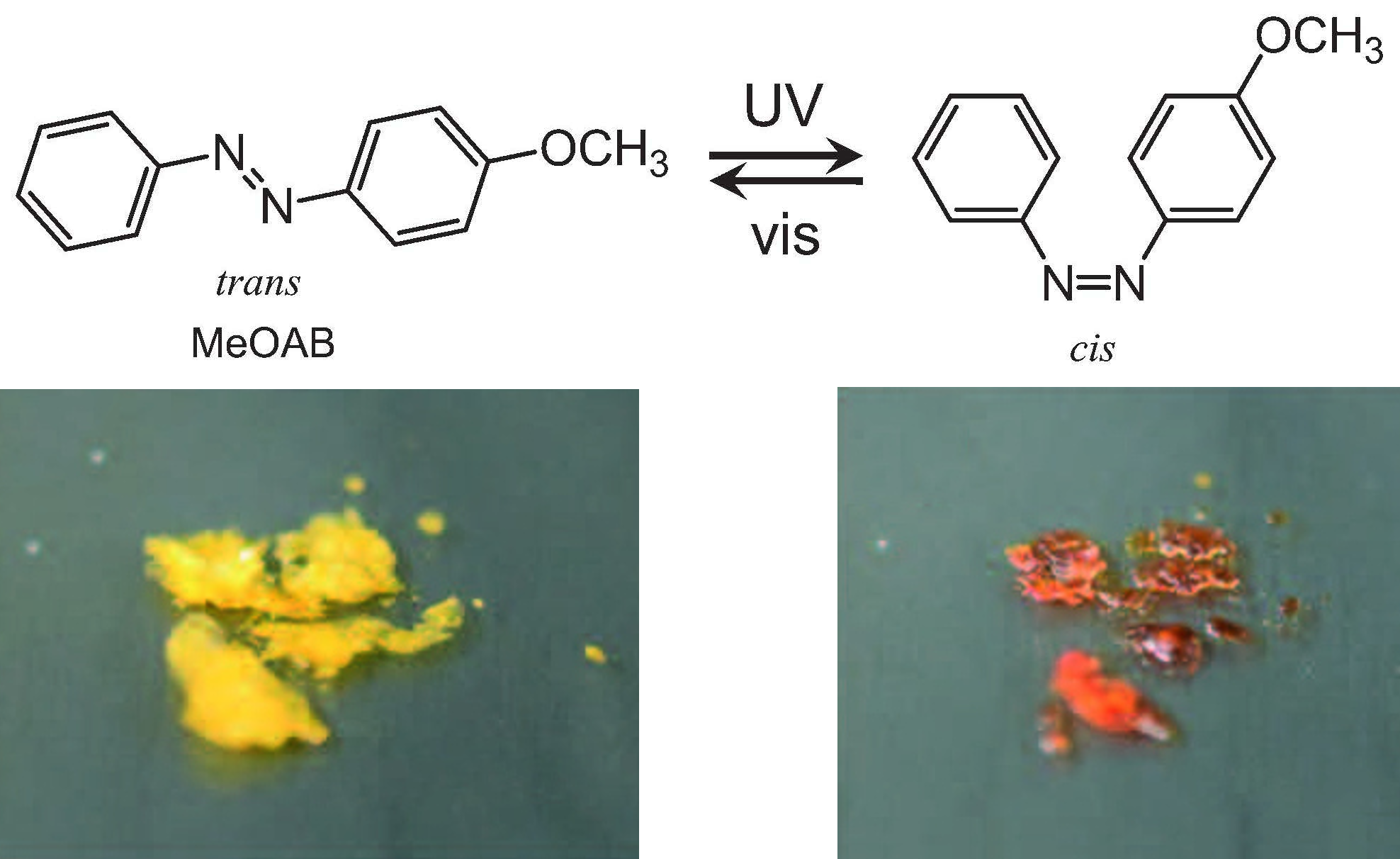
Photoisomerization of methoxyazobenzene results in reversible color change

== Reactions ==
Azobenzene is a weak base, but undergoes protonation at one nitrogen with a pK_{a} = -2.95. It functions as a Lewis base, e.g. toward boron trihalides. It binds to low valence metal centers, e.g. Ni(Ph_{2}N_{2})(PPh_{3})_{2} is well characterized.

Azobenzene oxidizes to give azoxybenzene. Hydrogenation gives diphenylhydrazine.

=== Trans–cis isomerization ===
Azobenzene (and derivatives) undergo photoisomerization of trans and cis isomers. cis-Azobenzene relaxes back, in dark, to the trans isomer. Such thermal relaxation is slow at room temperature. The two isomers can be switched with particular wavelengths of light: ultraviolet light, which corresponds to the energy gap of the π-π* (S_{2} state) transition, for trans-to-cis conversion, and blue light, which is equivalent to that of the n-π* (S_{1} state) transition, for cis-to-trans isomerization. For a variety of reasons, the cis isomer is less stable than the trans (for instance, it has a distorted configuration and is less delocalized than the trans configuration). Photoisomerization allows for reversible energy storage (as photoswitches).

==== Spectroscopic classification ====
The wavelengths at which azobenzene isomerization occurs depends on the particular structure of each azo molecule, but they are typically grouped into three classes: the azobenzene-type molecules, the aminoazobenzenes, and the pseudo-stilbenes. These azos are yellow, orange, and red, respectively, owing to the subtle differences in their electronic absorption spectra. The compounds similar to the unsubstituted azobenzene exhibit a low-intensity n-π* absorption in the visible region, and a much higher intensity π-π* absorption in the ultraviolet. Azos that are ortho- or para-substituted with electron-donating groups (such as aminos), are classified as aminoazobenzenes, and tend to closely spaced n-π* and π-π* bands in the visible. The pseudo-stilbene class is characterized by substituting the 4 and 4' positions of the two azo rings with electron-donating and electron-withdrawing groups (that is, the two opposite ends of the aromatic system are functionalized). The addition of this push-pull configuration results in a strongly asymmetric electron distribution, which modifies a host of optical properties. In particular, it shifts the absorption spectra of the trans and the cis isomers, so that they effectively overlap. Thus, for these compounds a single wavelength of light in the visible region will induce both the forward and reverse isomerization. Under illumination, these molecules cycle between the two isomeric states.

==== Photophysics of isomerization ====
The photo-isomerization of azobenzene is extremely rapid, occurring on picosecond timescales. The rate of the thermal back-relaxation varies greatly depending on the compound: usually hours for azobenzene-type molecules, minutes for aminoazobenzenes, and seconds for the pseudo-stilbenes.

The mechanism of isomerization has been the subject of some debate, with two pathways identified as viable: a rotation about the N-N bond, with disruption of the double bond, or via an inversion, with a semi-linear and hybridized transition state. It has been suggested that the trans-to-cis conversion occurs via rotation into the S_{2} state, whereas inversion gives rise to the cis-to-trans conversion. It is still under discussion which excited state plays a direct role in the series of the photoisomerization behavior. However, the latest research utilizing femtosecond transient absorption spectroscopy has suggested that the S_{2} state undergoes internal conversion to the S_{1} state, and then the trans-to-cis isomerization proceeds. Recently another isomerization pathway has been proposed by Diau, the "concerted inversion" pathway in which both CNN bond angles bend at the same time. There is experimental and computational evidence for the existence of a multistate rotation mechanism involving a triplet state.

==== Photoinduced motions ====
The photo-isomerization of azobenzene is a form of light-induced molecular motion. This isomerization can also lead to motion on larger length scales. For instance, polarized light will cause the molecules to isomerize and relax in random positions. However, those relaxed (trans) molecules that fall perpendicular to the incoming light polarization will no longer be able to absorb, and will remain fixed. Thus, there is a statistical enrichment of chromophores perpendicular to polarized light (orientational hole burning). Polarized irradiation will make an azo-material anisotropic and therefore optically birefringent and dichroic. This photo-orientation can also be used to orient other materials (especially in liquid crystal systems).

== Miscellaneous ==
Azobenzene undergoes ortho-metalation by metal complexes, e.g. dicobalt octacarbonyl:

Info about the carcinogenicity of Azobenzene can be found on the EPA site, where it has been classified as a "probable human carcinogen" based on evidence of carcinogenicity in animals.

== Cited sources ==
- Haynes, William M., ed. (2011). CRC Handbook of Chemistry and Physics (92nd ed.). Boca Raton, Florida: CRC Press. p. 3.32. ISBN 1-4398-5511-0.
