= M-Phenylenediamine =

m-Phenylenediamine
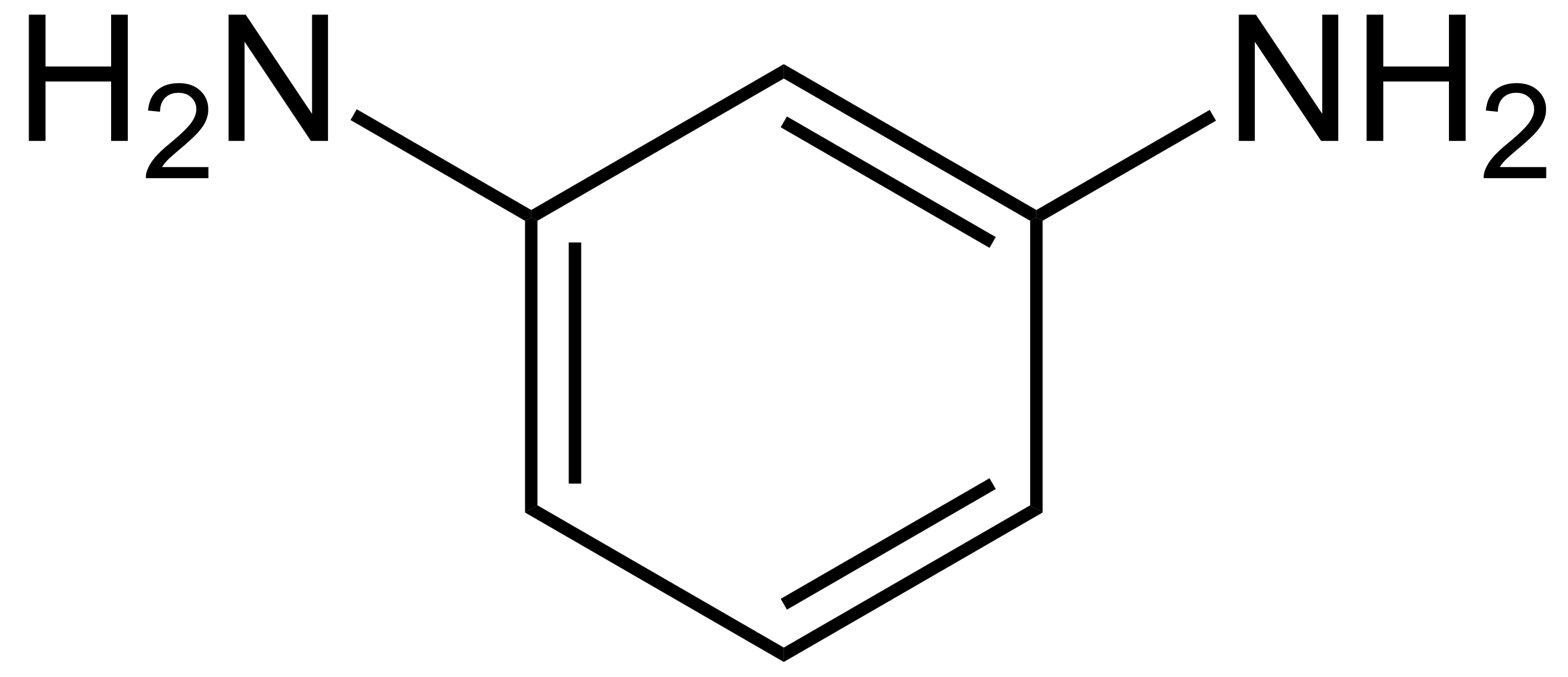

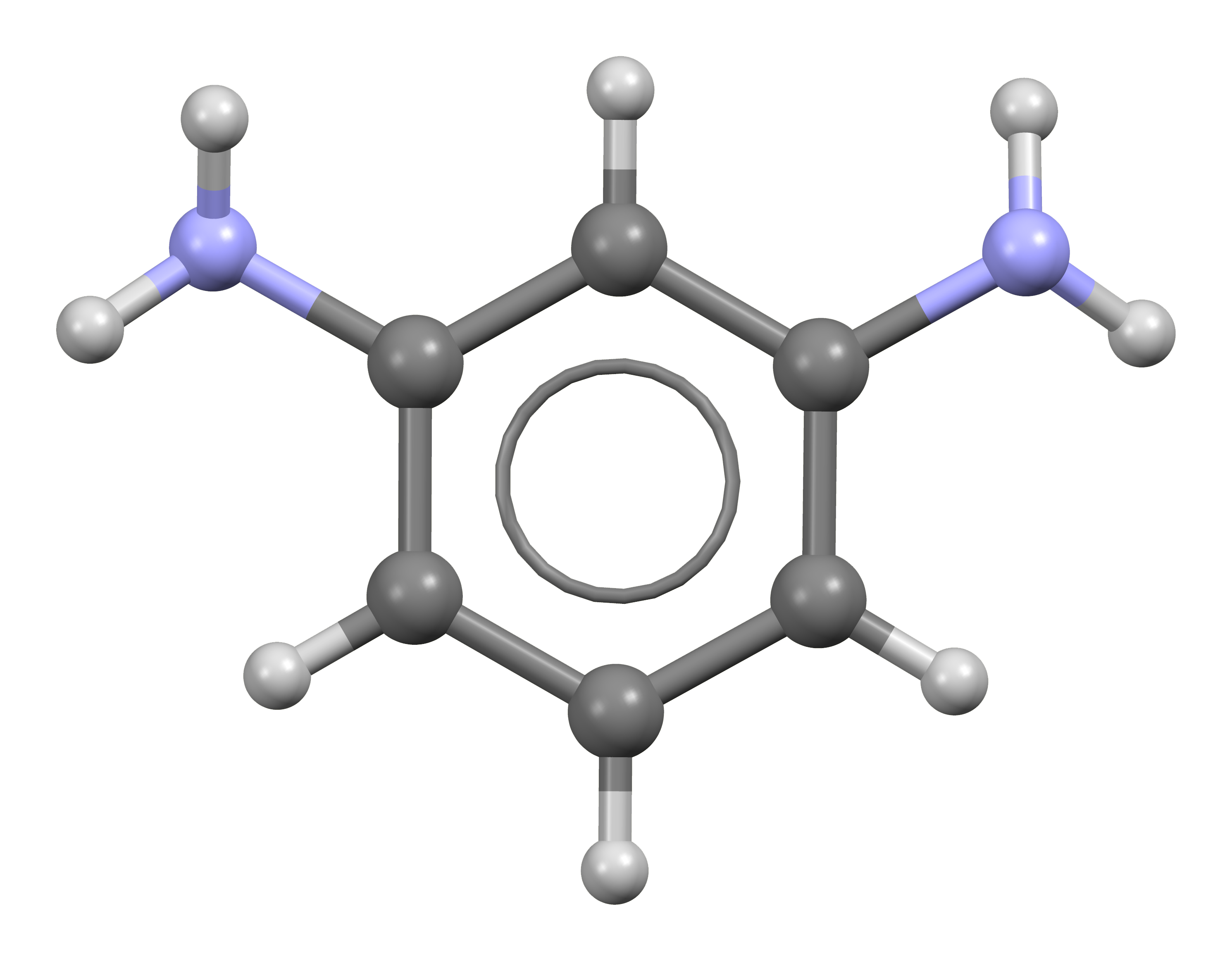

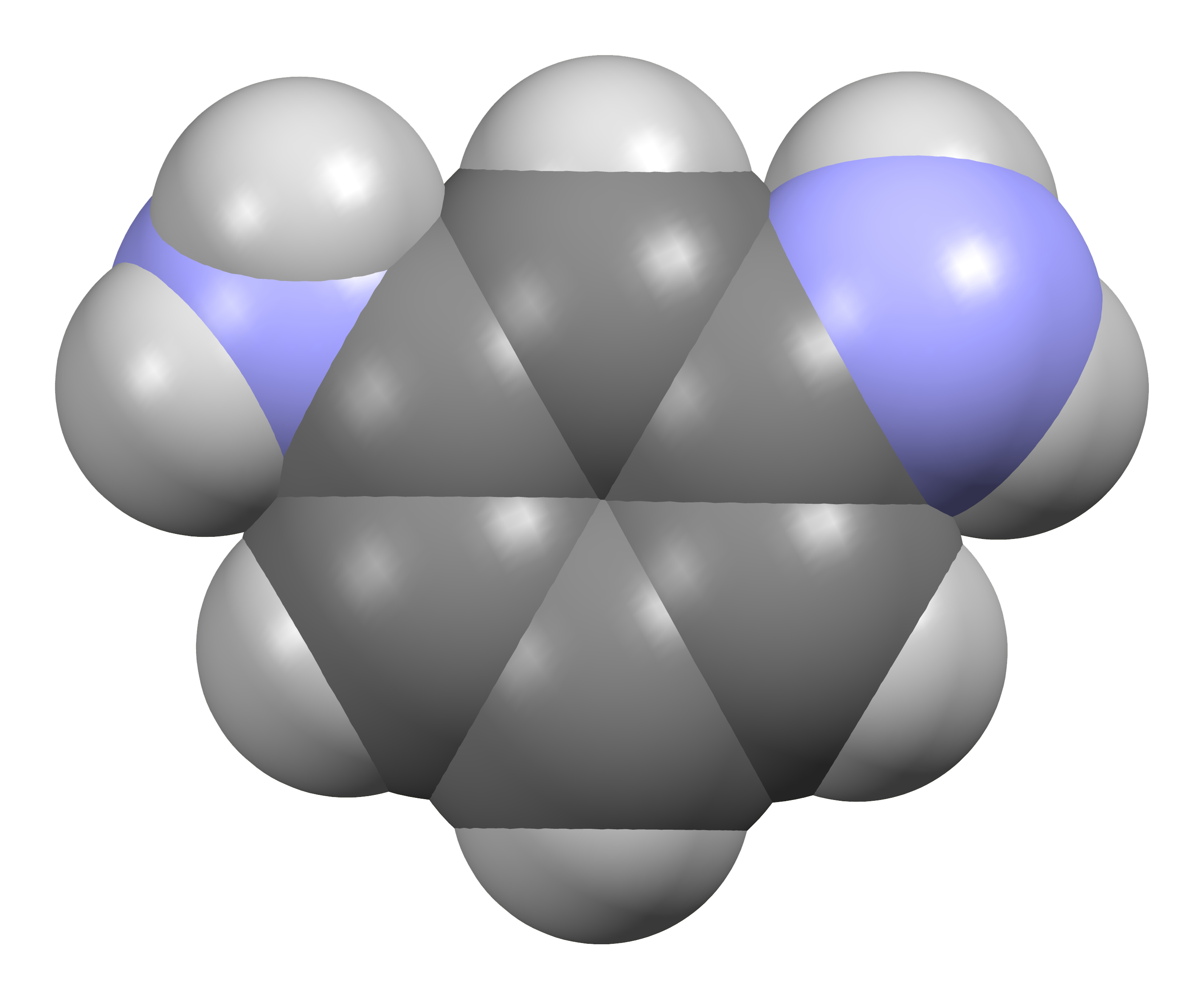

Names
- Preferred IUPAC name Benzene-1,3-diamine
- Other names 1,3-Diaminobenzene; MPD; MPDA

Identifiers
| CAS Number | 108-45-2 |
| 3D model (JSmol) | Interactive image |
| Beilstein Reference | 471357 |
| ChEBI | CHEBI:8092 |
| ChEMBL | ChEMBL1595914 |
| ChemSpider | 13836283 |
| ECHA InfoCard | 100.003.259 |
| EC Number | 203-584-7 |
| KEGG | C02454 |
| PubChem CID | 7935 |
| RTECS number | SS7700000 |
| UNII | OE624J2447 |
| UN number | 1673 |
| CompTox Dashboard (EPA) | DTXSID4021137 |
- InChI: InChI=1S/C6H8N2/c7-5-2-1-3-6(8)4-5/h1-4H,7-8H2 Key: WZCQRUWWHSTZEM-UHFFFAOYSA-N; InChI=1/C6H8N2/c7-5-2-1-3-6(8)4-5/h1-4H,7-8H2 Key: WZCQRUWWHSTZEM-UHFFFAOYAM
- SMILES: c1cc(cc(c1)N)N

Properties
| Chemical formula | C_{6}H_{8}N_{2} |
| Molar mass | 108.144 g·mol^{−1} |
| Appearance | White solid |
| Melting point | 64 to 66 °C (147 to 151 °F; 337 to 339 K) |
| Boiling point | 282 to 284 °C (540 to 543 °F; 555 to 557 K) |
| Solubility in water | 42.9 g/100 ml (20 °C) |
| Acidity (pK_{a}) | 2.50 (doubly protonated form; 20 °C, H_{2}O); 5.11 (conjugate acid; 20 °C, H_{2}O) |
| Magnetic susceptibility (χ) | −70.53·10^{−6} cm^{3}/mol |

Hazards
- GHS labelling
| Pictograms | (GHS06: Toxic) (GHS07: Exclamation mark) (GHS08: Health hazard) (GHS09: Environmental hazard) |
| Signal word | Danger |
| Hazard statements | H301, H311, H317, H319, H331, H341, H410 |
| Precautionary statements | P201, P202, P261, P264, P270, P271, P272, P273, P280, P281, P301+P310, P302+P352, P304+P340, P305+P351+P338, P308+P313, P311, P312, P321, P322, P330, P333+P313, P337+P313, P361, P363, P391, P403+P233, P405, P501 |
| NFPA 704 (fire diamond) | 3 1 0 |
| Flash point | 187 °C (369 °F; 460 K) |
| Autoignition temperature | 560 °C (1,040 °F; 833 K) |
- Except where otherwise noted, data are given for materials in their standard state (at 25 °C [77 °F], 100 kPa). verify (what is ?) Infobox references

m-Phenylenediamine, also called 1,3-diaminobenzene, is an organic compound with the formula C_{6}H_{4}(NH_{2})_{2}. It is an isomer of o-phenylenediamine and p-phenylenediamine. This aromatic diamine is a colourless solid that appears as needles, but turns red or purple on exposure to air due to formation of oxidation products. Samples often come as colourless flakes and may darken in storage.

== Production ==
m-Phenylenediamine is produced by hydrogenation of 1,3-dinitrobenzene. The dinitrobenzene is prepared by dinitration of benzene.

== Applications ==
m-Phenylenediamine is used in the preparation of various polymers including aramid fibers, epoxy resins, wire enamel coatings and polyurea elastomers. Other uses for m-phenylenediamine include as an accelerator for adhesive resins, and as a component of dyes for leather and textiles. Basic Brown 1, Basic Orange 2, Direct Black 38, and Developed Black BH. In hair-dying, m-phenylenediamine is a "coupling agent", used to produce blue colors. It has a role to play in the synthesis of a compound that is called Salermide.
