= 1,3-Dinitrobenzene =

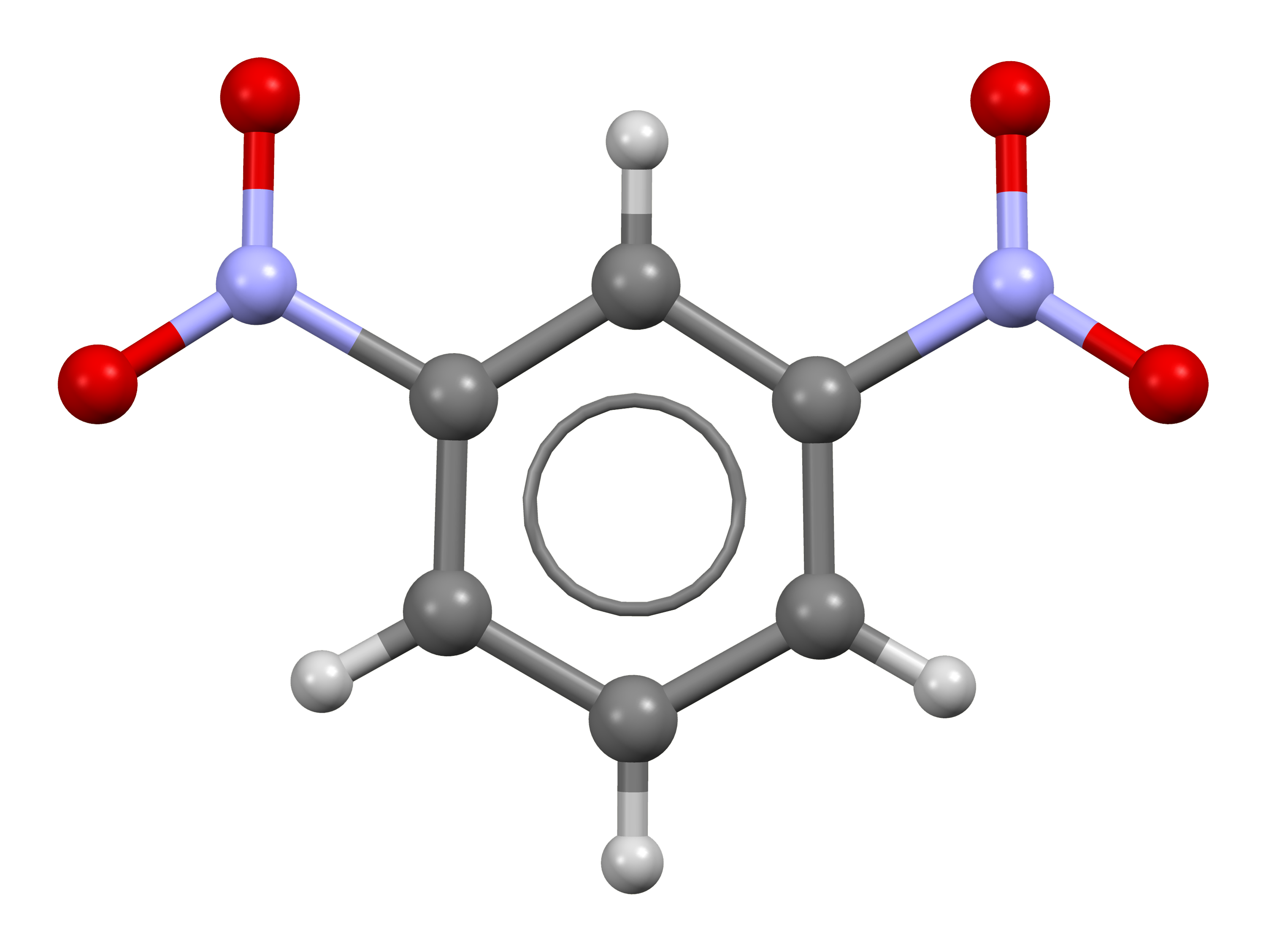

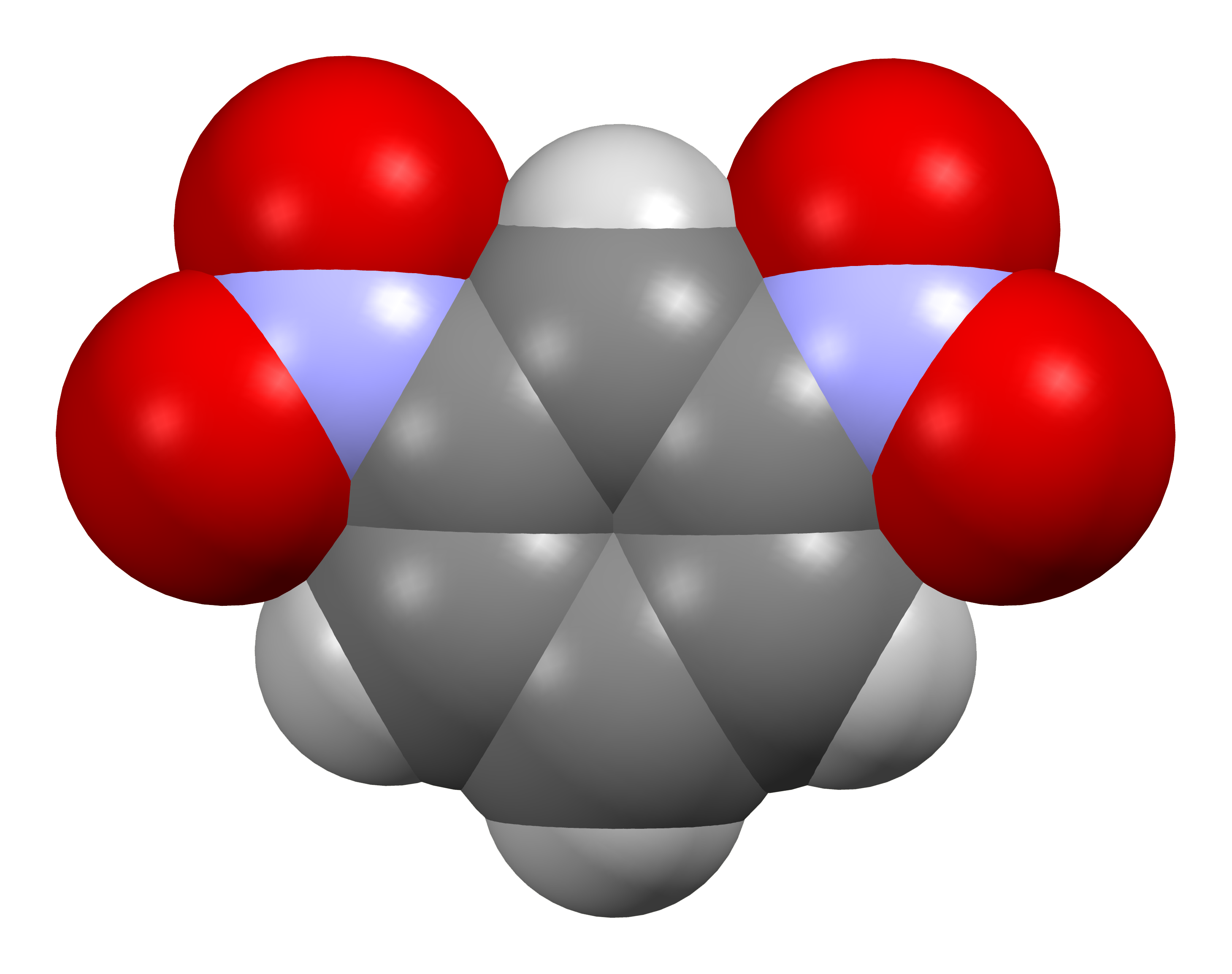

Names
- Preferred IUPAC name 1,3-Dinitrobenzene
- Other names meta-dinitrobenzene

Identifiers
CAS Number	99-65-0
3D model (JSmol)	Interactive image
ChEBI	CHEBI:51397
ChEMBL	ChEMBL114070
ChemSpider	7172
ECHA InfoCard	100.002.524
EC Number	202-776-8
PubChem CID	7452
RTECS number	CZ7350000
UNII	DK8B627BU0
UN number	1597 3443
CompTox Dashboard (EPA)	DTXSID9024065
- InChI: InChI=1S/C6H4N2O4/c9-7(10)5-2-1-3-6(4-5)8(11)12/h1-4H Key: WDCYWAQPCXBPJA-UHFFFAOYSA-N
- SMILES: C1=CC(=CC(=C1)[N+](=O)[O-])[N+](=O)[O-]

Properties
Chemical formula	C_{6}H_{4}N_{2}O_{4}
Molar mass	168.108 g·mol^{−1}
Appearance	yellow solid
Density	1.575 g/cm^{3}
Melting point	89.6 °C (193.3 °F; 362.8 K)
Boiling point	297 °C (567 °F; 570 K)

Hazards
- GHS labelling
Pictograms	(GHS06: Toxic) (GHS08: Health hazard) (GHS09: Environmental hazard)
Signal word	Danger
Hazard statements	H300, H310, H330, H373, H410
Precautionary statements	P260, P262, P264, P270, P271, P273, P280, P284, P301+P310, P302+P350, P304+P340, P310, P314, P320, P321, P330, P361, P363, P391, P403+P233, P405, P501
Flash point	149 °C (300 °F; 422 K)
- Except where otherwise noted, data are given for materials in their standard state (at 25 °C [77 °F], 100 kPa). Infobox references

1,3-Dinitrobenzene is one of three isomers of dinitrobenzene, with the formula C_{6}H_{4}(NO_{2})_{2}. The compound is a yellow solid that is soluble in organic solvents.

== Preparation ==
1,3-Dinitrobenzene is accessible by nitration of nitrobenzene. The reaction proceeds under acid catalysis using sulfuric acid. The directing effect of the nitro group of nitrobenzene leads to 93% of the product resulting from nitration at the meta-position. The ortho- and para-products occur in only 6% and 1%, respectively.

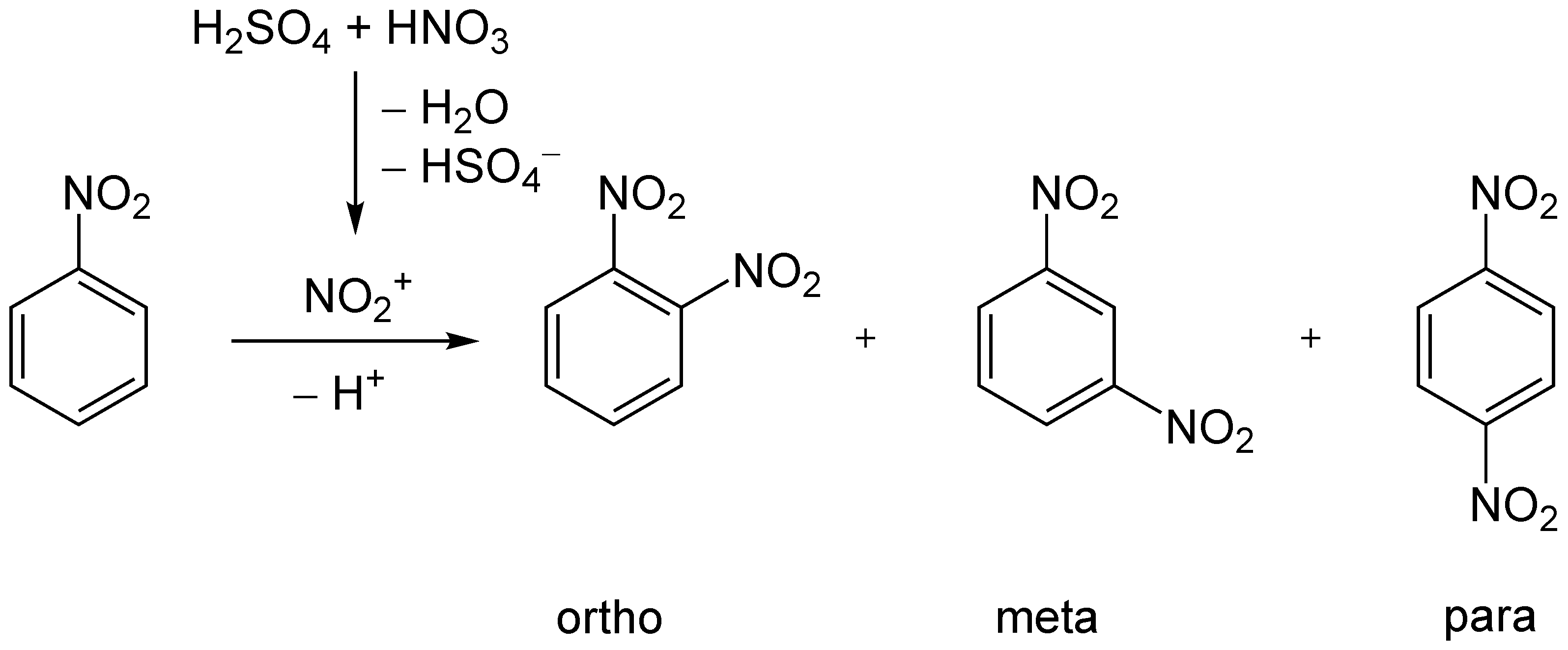

== Reactions ==
Reduction of 1,3-dinitrobenzene with sodium sulfide in aqueous solution leads to 3-nitroaniline. Further reduction with iron and hydrochloric acid (HCl) gives m-phenylenediamine.

1,3-Dinitrobenzene can be nitrated to 1,3,5-trinitrobenzene with nitronium tetrafluoroborate in fluorosulfuric acid at 150 °C.
