= 2,4,6-Trinitrobenzoic acid =

Impact-resistant high explosive

Names
- IUPAC name 2,4,6-Trinitrobenzoic acid

Identifiers
CAS Number	129-66-8; 35860-50-5
3D model (JSmol)	Interactive image
Abbreviations	TNBA
ChemSpider	8204
ECHA InfoCard	100.004.509
EC Number	204-958-2
PubChem CID	8518
UNII	134ID308V9
UN number	0215
CompTox Dashboard (EPA)	DTXSID70861781
- InChI: InChI=1S/C7H3N3O8/c11-7(12)6-4(9(15)16)1-3(8(13)14)2-5(6)10(17)18/h1-2H,(H,11,12)
- SMILES: C1=C(C=C(C(=C1[N+](=O)[O-])C(=O)O)[N+](=O)[O-])[N+](=O)[O-]

Properties
Chemical formula	C_{7}H_{3}N_{3}O_{8}
Molar mass	257.114 g·mol^{−1}
Appearance	pale yellow
Melting point	228.7 °C (Decomposes)
Solubility in water	Insoluble
Solubility	Soluble in acetone, methanol, benzene, ethanol, ether
log P	0.23
Vapor pressure	7.23 10^{−9}mm Hg
Henry's law constant (k_{H})	2.62 10^{−14}atm cu m/mol
Acidity (pK_{a})	0.65

Structure
Crystal structure	Orthorhombic or rhombohedral

Hazards
- Occupational safety and health (OHS/OSH)
Main hazards	explosive
- GHS labelling
Pictograms	(GHS01: Explosive)
Signal word	Danger
Hazard statements	H201
Precautionary statements	P210, P230, P240, P250, P280, P370+P380, P372, P373, P401, P501
- Except where otherwise noted, data are given for materials in their standard state (at 25 °C [77 °F], 100 kPa). Infobox references

2,4,6-Trinitrobenzoic acid (TNBA) is an organic compound with the formula (O_{2}N)_{3}C_{6}H_{2}CO_{2}H. It is a high explosive nitrated derivative of benzoic acid.

== Preparation and reactions ==
2,4,6-Trinitrobenzoic acid is prepared by oxidation of 2,4,6-trinitrotoluene (TNT). It is formed by oxidation of TNT and nitric acid with chlorate and with dichromate.

Upon heating, 2,4,6-trinitrobenzoic acid undergoes decarboxylation to give 1,3,5-trinitrobenzene. Reduction with tin gives 2,4,6-triaminobenzenoic acid, a precursor to phloroglucinol (1,3,5-trihydroxybenzene).
