= Nitrosobenzene =

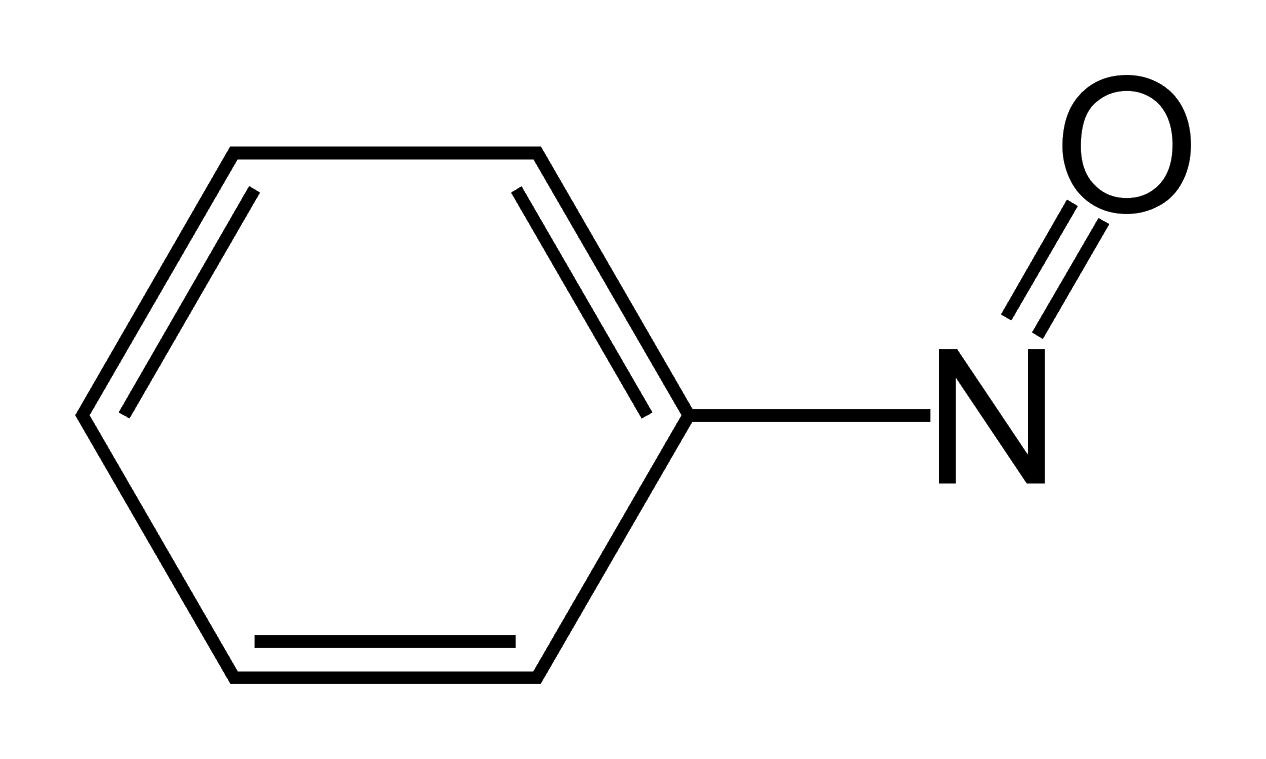
- Structural formula

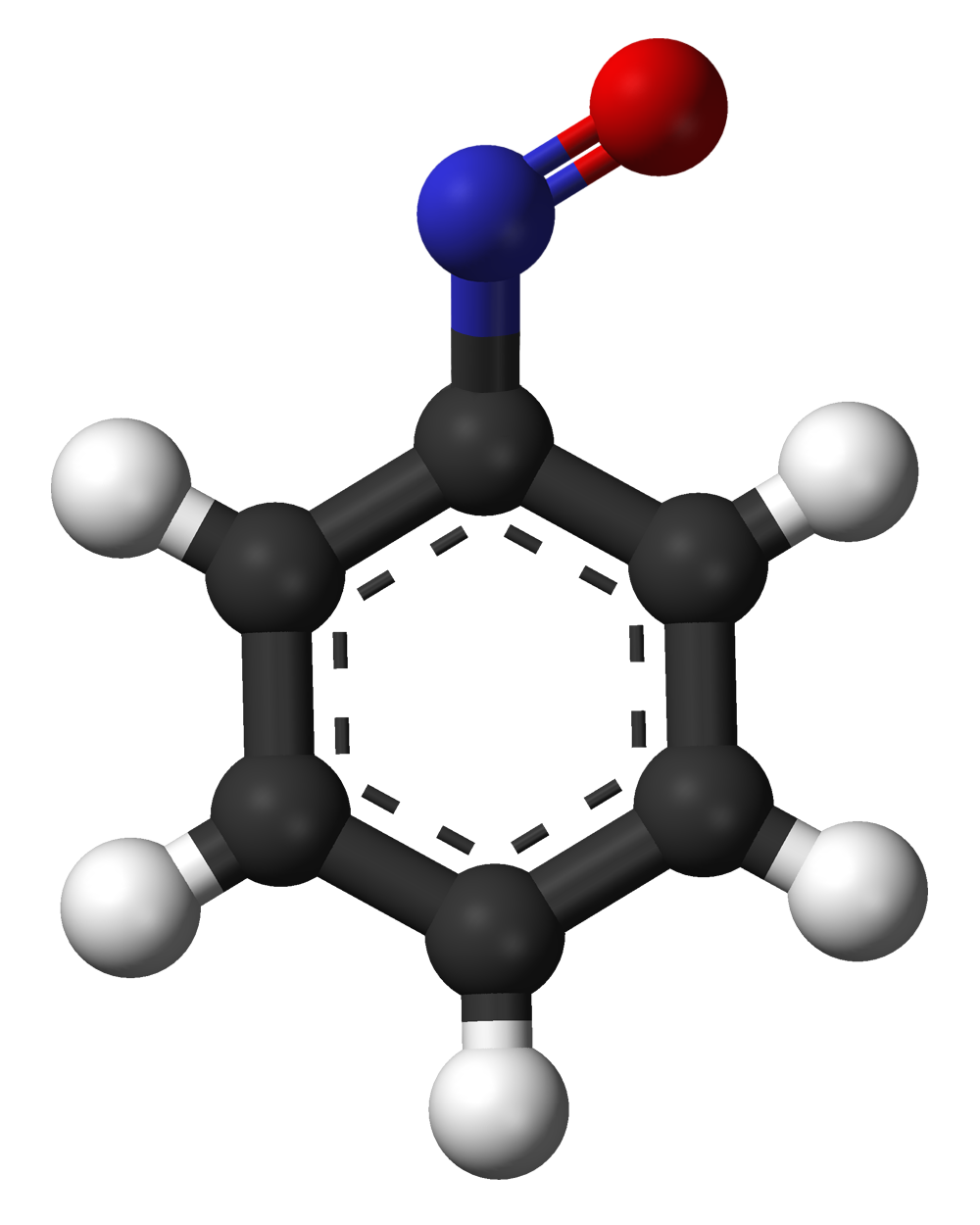
- Ball-and-stick model

Names
- Preferred IUPAC name Nitrosobenzene

Identifiers
CAS Number	586-96-9
3D model (JSmol)	monomer: Interactive image; dimer: Interactive image
Abbreviations	PhNO
ChEBI	CHEBI:27986
ChEMBL	ChEMBL98797
ChemSpider	10989
ECHA InfoCard	100.008.721
KEGG	C06876
PubChem CID	11473
RTECS number	DA6497525
UNII	ZI9W9E8G2Z
CompTox Dashboard (EPA)	DTXSID7060417
- InChI: InChI=1S/C6H5NO/c8-7-6-4-2-1-3-5-6/h1-5H Key: NLRKCXQQSUWLCH-UHFFFAOYSA-N; InChI=1/C6H5NO/c8-7-6-4-2-1-3-5-6/h1-5H Key: NLRKCXQQSUWLCH-UHFFFAOYAR
- SMILES: monomer: O=Nc1ccccc1; dimer: c1ccccc1[N+](=O)N([O-])c1ccccc1

Properties
Chemical formula	C_{6}H_{5}NO
Molar mass	107.112 g·mol^{−1}
Appearance	Dark green solid (freshly sublimed monomer); pale yellow solid (dimeric form); bright green solution (light sensitive)
Melting point	65 to 69 °C (149 to 156 °F; 338 to 342 K)
Boiling point	59 °C (138 °F; 332 K) (at 18 mmHg)
Solubility in water	Low
Solubility in other solvents	Sol. in organic solvents
Magnetic susceptibility (χ)	−59.1·10^{−6} cm^{3}/mol

Structure
Molecular shape	N is sp^{2}

Hazards
- Occupational safety and health (OHS/OSH)
Main hazards	toxic
- GHS labelling
Pictograms	(GHS06: Toxic)
Signal word	Danger
Hazard statements	H301, H312, H332
Precautionary statements	P261, P264, P270, P271, P280, P301+P310, P302+P352, P304+P312, P304+P340, P312, P321, P322, P330, P363, P405, P501

Related compounds
Related compounds	Nitrobenzene; Aniline
- Except where otherwise noted, data are given for materials in their standard state (at 25 °C [77 °F], 100 kPa). verify (what is ?) Infobox references

Nitrosobenzene is the organic compound with the formula C_{6}H_{5}NO. It is one of the prototypical organic nitroso compounds. Characteristic of its functional group, it is a dark green species that exists in equilibrium with its pale yellow dimer. Both monomer and dimer are diamagnetic.

== Monomer-dimer equilibrium ==
Nitrosobenzene and other nitrosoarenes typically participate in a monomer-dimer equilibrium. The dimers are often favored in the solid state, whereas the deeply colored monomers are favored in dilute solution or at higher temperatures. The dimers can be formulated as Ar(O^{−})N^{+}=N^{+}(O^{−})Ar. They exist as cis- and trans-isomers due to the presence of the N–N double bond. The dimers are sometimes called azobenzenedioxides. The cis-trans isomerization occurs via the intermediacy of the monomer.

In the case of nitrosobenzene itself, the metastable monomeric form could be prepared by sublimation onto a cold finger. The monomeric material is selectively sublimed due to its lower molecular weight and is collected on a cold finger as lustrous, dark green crystals. Over time, the monomeric material dimerizes to give the parent azobenzene dioxide as a pale yellow solid. As dictated by Le Chatelier's principle, nitrosobenzene exists in the solution phase as a mixture of monomer and dimer in dynamic equilibrium whose composition is dependent on temperature (monomer favored at higher temperature) and concentration (monomer favored at low concentration), as well as the identity of the medium (gas phase or solvent).

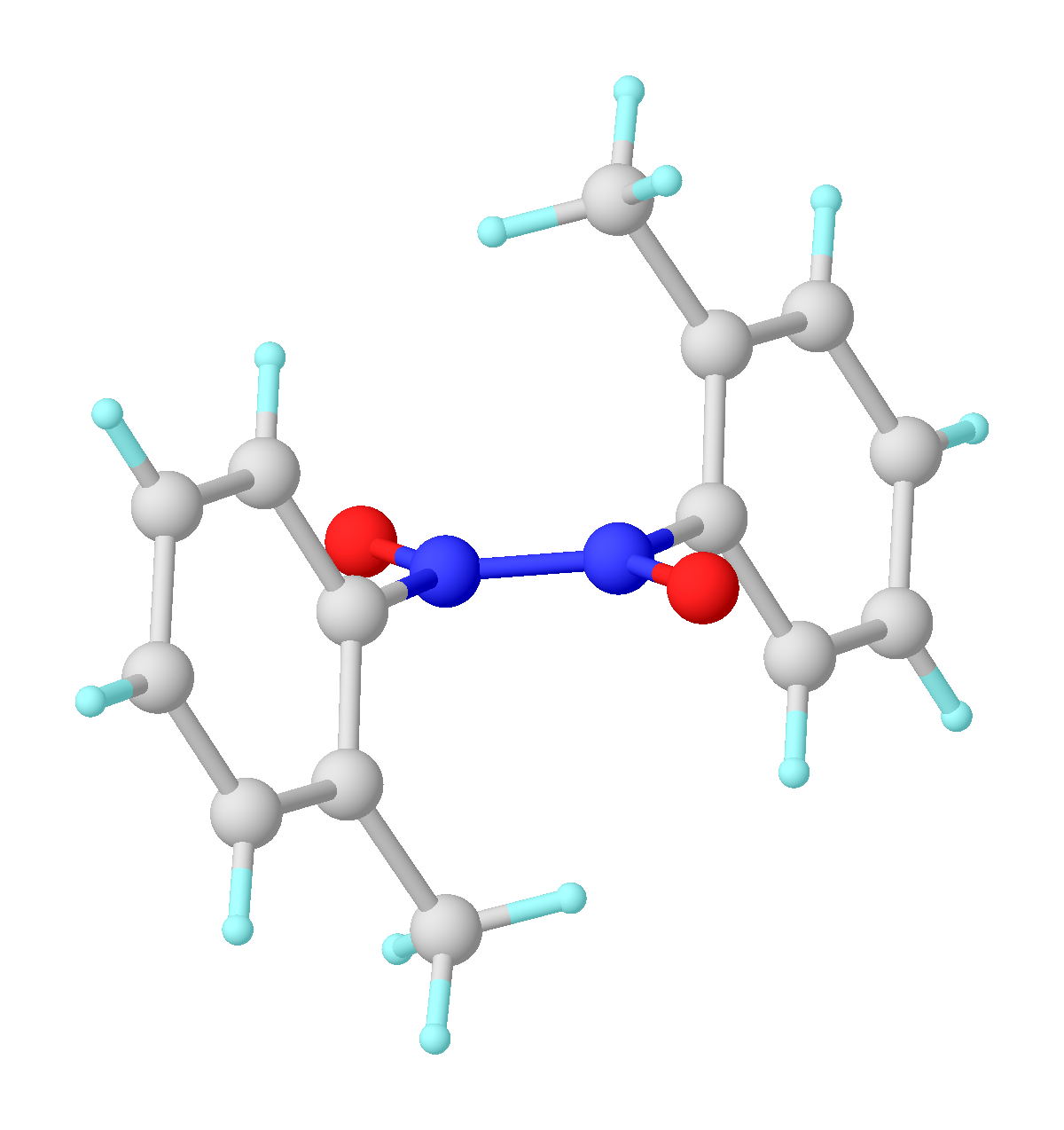
Structure of 2-nitrosotoluene dimer.

== Preparation ==
Nitrosobenzene was first prepared by Adolf von Baeyer by the reaction of diphenylmercury and nitrosyl bromide:

(C_{6}H_{5})_{2}Hg + BrNO → C_{6}H_{5}NO + C_{6}H_{5}HgBr

A modern synthesis entails reduction of nitrobenzene to phenylhydroxylamine (C_{6}H_{5}NHOH) which is then oxidized by sodium dichromate (Na_{2}Cr_{2}O_{7}).

Nitrosobenzene can also be prepared by oxidation of aniline using peroxymonosulfuric acid (Caro's acid) or potassium peroxymonosulfate under biphasic conditions. It is usually purified by sublimation or by steam distillation, where it comes over as a green liquid that solidifies to a colorless solid.

== Characteristic reactions ==
Nitrosobenzene undergoes Diels–Alder reactions with dienes. Condensation with anilines affords azobenzene derivatives in a reaction known as the Mills reaction or Baeyer-Mills reaction. Reduction of nitrosobenzene produces aniline.

Most characteristically, nitrosobenzene condenses with active methylene groups, such as those of malonic esters and phenylacetonitrile. Phenylacetonitrile (PhCH_{2}CN) gives the imine (PhC(CN)=NPh) in a reaction known as the Ehrlich-Sachs reaction:

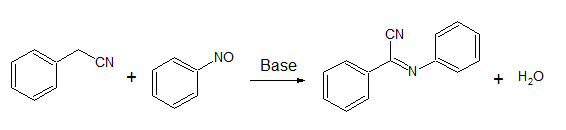

Sometimes condensation with active methylene compounds gives products of O-nitroso-aldol reaction:

R–CH_{2}-CHO + Ph–NO → R–CH(CHO)–O–NHPh (aminoxylation adduct)

=== Lewis basicity ===
Nitrosobenzene (and many nitrosoarenes) are good Lewis bases. They serve as ligands in many kinds of complexes, almost always with the nitrogen as the basic site. In Ru(acac)_{2}(C_{6}H_{5}NO)_{2}, nitrosobenzene is monodentate whereas in [Ru(acac)_{2}(μ^{−}C_{6}H_{5}NO)]_{2} the nitrosobenzene is a bridging ligand.
