= Azobenzene dioxide =

Chemical compound (C6H5N(O))2

Identifiers
CAS Number	35506-28-6; cis: 115626-83-0 ?
3D model (JSmol)	Interactive image
ChemSpider	cis: 35764942
PubChem CID	135418545
CompTox Dashboard (EPA)	DTXSID30921779
- InChI: InChI=1S/C12H10N2O2/c1-2-4-8(5-3-1)13-14-12-7-6-9-10(15-9)11(12)16-12/h1-7,9-11H Key: CDTVSBIIRCYWTM-UHFFFAOYSA-N; cis: InChI=1S/C12H10N2O2/c15-13(11-7-3-1-4-8-11)14(16)12-9-5-2-6-10-12/h1-10H/b14-13+ Key: WHFNSVMCGRQIRC-BUHFOSPRSA-N
- SMILES: C1=CC=C(C=C1)N(=O)=N(=O)C2=CC=CC=C2

Properties
Chemical formula	C_{12}H_{10}N_{2}O_{2}
Molar mass	214.224 g·mol^{−1}
Appearance	colorless solid
Density	1.31 g/cm^{3}
Melting point	68 °C (154 °F; 341 K) with decomposition to the monomer
- Except where otherwise noted, data are given for materials in their standard state (at 25 °C [77 °F], 100 kPa). Infobox references

Azobenzene dioxide is the organic compound with the formula (C_{6}H_{5}N(O))_{2}. Both cis and trans isomers are known. The cis isomer has been crystallized. It is colorless.

== Reactions ==
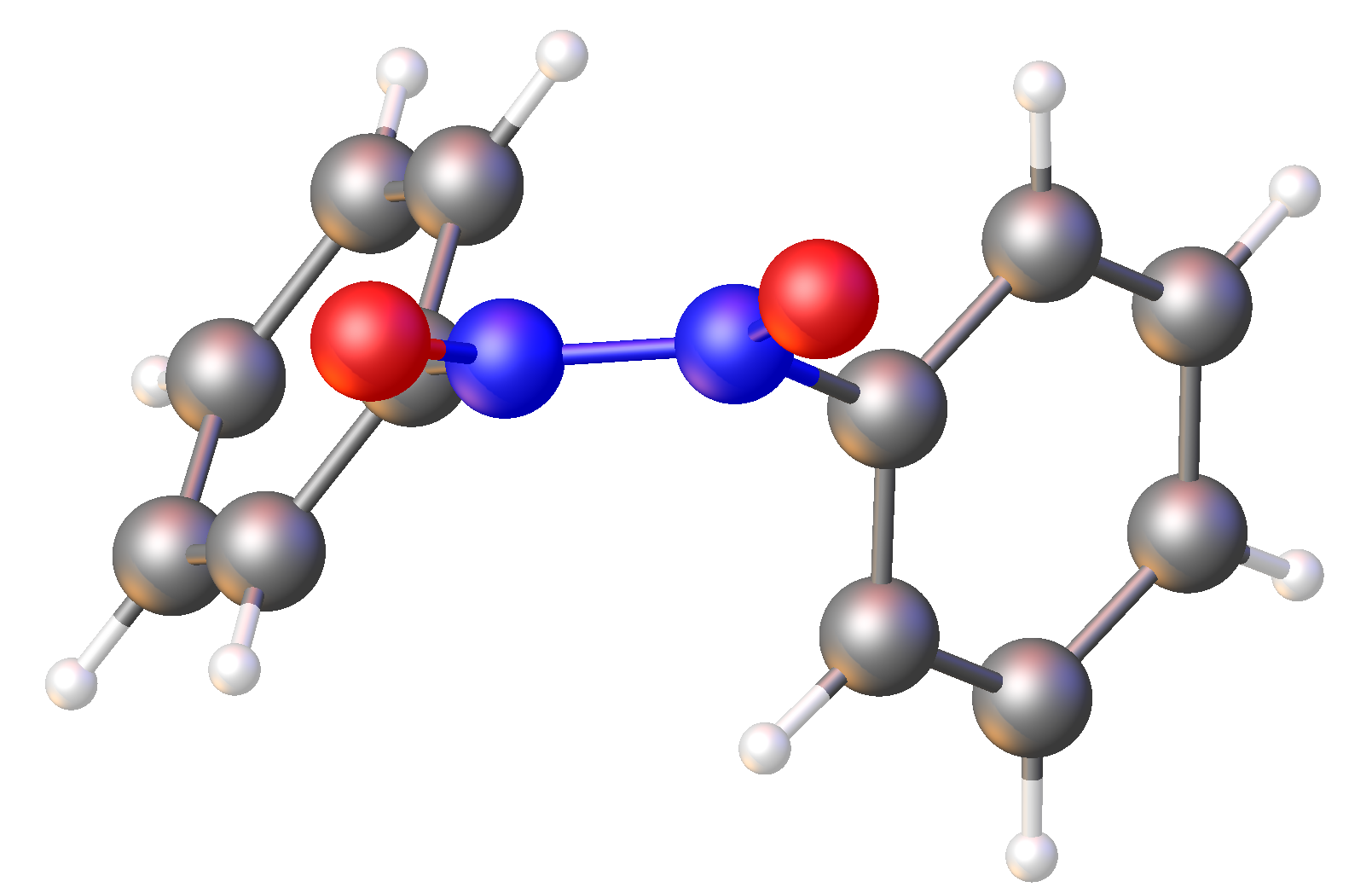
Structure of (PhNO)_{2} viewed down an approximate C_{2} axis. The N-O and N-N distances are 1.26 (average of two) and 1.33 Å, respectively. Color code: blue=N, red = O, gray = C.

When dissolved, azobenzene dioxide converts to deeply blue nitrosobenzene:

(C_{6}H_{5}N(O))_{2} → 2 C_{6}H_{5}NO

Azobenzene dioxide is a weak base, forming coordination complexes such as [Co{C_{6}H_{5}(O)NN(O)C_{6}H_{5}}_{4}]^{2+}.
