= 1,2,3-Trinitrobenzene =

- Skeletal formula

Names
- Preferred IUPAC name 1,2,3-Trinitrobenzene

Identifiers
CAS Number	603-13-4
3D model (JSmol)	Interactive image
ChEBI	CHEBI:48114
ChemSpider	455276
EC Number	202-752-7
PubChem CID	521922
UNII	SPX6MW5XHL
CompTox Dashboard (EPA)	DTXSID40209050
- InChI: InChI=1S/C6H3N3O6/c10-7(11)4-2-1-3-5(8(12)13)6(4)9(14)15/h1-3H Key: ONOWMDPHGJEBAZ-UHFFFAOYSA-N
- SMILES: c1cc(c(c(c1)[N+](=O)[O-])[N+](=O)[O-])[N+](=O)[O-]

Properties
Chemical formula	C_{6}H_{3}N_{3}O_{6}
Molar mass	213.105 g·mol^{−1}
- Except where otherwise noted, data are given for materials in their standard state (at 25 °C [77 °F], 100 kPa). Infobox references

1,2,3-Trinitrobenzene is an isomer of trinitrobenzene.

== See also ==
- 1,3,5-Trinitrobenzene
