= 1,3,5-Trinitrobenzene =

- Skeletal formula

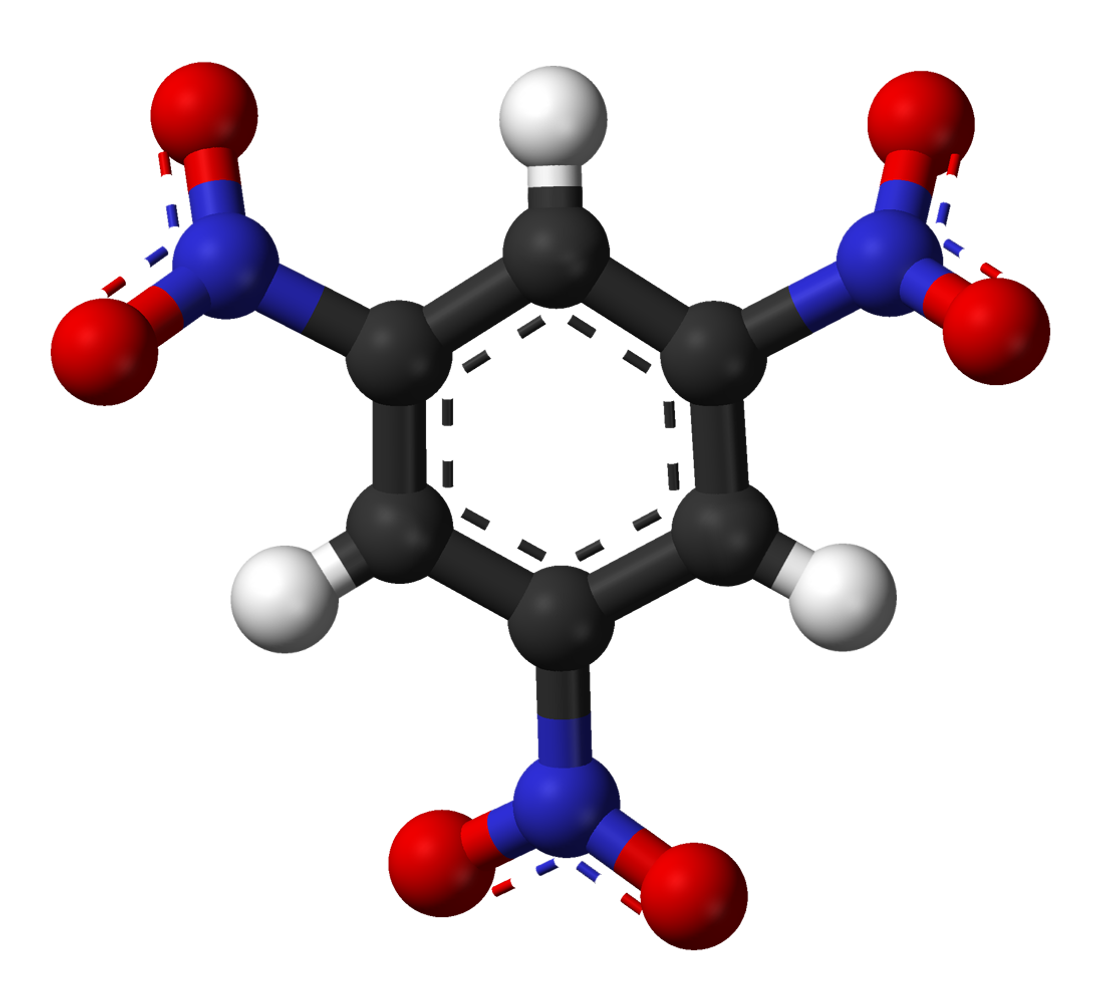
- Ball-and-stick model

Names
- Preferred IUPAC name 1,3,5-Trinitrobenzene
- Other names sym-Trinitrobenzene

Identifiers
CAS Number	99-35-4
3D model (JSmol)	Interactive image
ChEBI	CHEBI:48113
ChemSpider	7156
ECHA InfoCard	100.002.502
EC Number	202-752-7
Gmelin Reference	27979
PubChem CID	7434
UNII	2H75703R1X
UN number	0388
CompTox Dashboard (EPA)	DTXSID6021406
- InChI: InChI=1S/C6H3N3O6/c10-7(11)4-1-5(8(12)13)3-6(2-4)9(14)15/h1-3H Key: UATJOMSPNYCXIX-UHFFFAOYSA-N
- SMILES: C1=C(C=C(C=C1[N+](=O)[O-])[N+](=O)[O-])[N+](=O)[O-]

Properties
Chemical formula	C_{6}H_{3}N_{3}O_{6}
Molar mass	213.105 g·mol^{−1}
Density	1.76 g/cm^{3}
Melting point	123.2 °C (253.8 °F; 396.3 K)
Boiling point	315 °C (599 °F; 588 K)
Solubility in water	330 mg/L
Magnetic susceptibility (χ)	−74.55·10^{−6} cm^{3}/mol

Hazards
- GHS labelling
Pictograms	(GHS01: Explosive) (GHS06: Toxic) (GHS07: Exclamation mark) (GHS09: Environmental hazard)
Signal word	Danger
Hazard statements	H201, H300, H310, H330, H373, H410
Precautionary statements	P210, P230, P240, P250, P260, P262, P264, P270, P271, P273, P280, P284, P301+P316, P302+P352, P304+P340, P316, P319, P320, P321, P330, P361+P364, P370+P380, P372, P373, P391, P401, P403+P233, P405, P501
NFPA 704 (fire diamond)	2 3 4
- Except where otherwise noted, data are given for materials in their standard state (at 25 °C [77 °F], 100 kPa). verify (what is ?) Infobox references

1,3,5-Trinitrobenzene is one of three isomers of trinitrobenzene with the formula C_{6}H_{3}(NO_{2})_{3}. A pale yellow solid, the compound is highly explosive.

== Synthesis and reactions ==
1,3,5-Trinitrobenzene is produced by decarboxylation of 2,4,6-trinitrobenzoic acid.

1,3,5-Trinitrobenzene forms charge-transfer complexes with electron-rich arenes.

Reduction of 1,3,5-trinitrobenzene gives 1,3,5-triaminobenzene, a precursor to phloroglucinol.

== Uses and applications ==
Trinitrobenzene is more explosive than TNT, but more expensive. It is primarily used as a high explosive compound for commercial mining and military applications. It has also been used as a narrow-range pH indicator, an agent to vulcanize natural rubber, and a mediating agent to mediate the synthesis of other explosive compounds.

== See also ==
- 1,2,3-Trinitrobenzene
- TNT equivalent
- RE factor
