= 1,2-Dinitrobenzene =

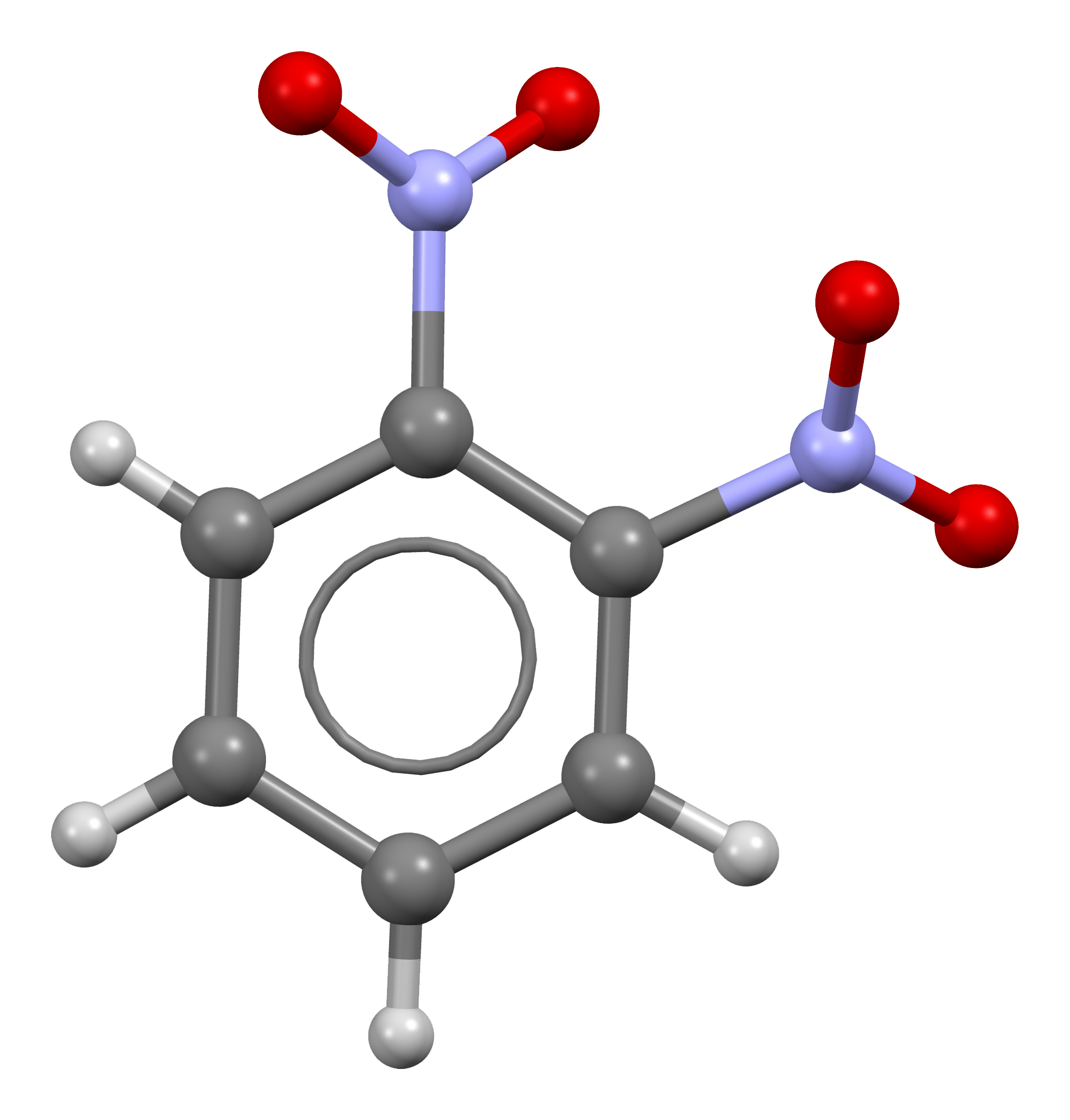

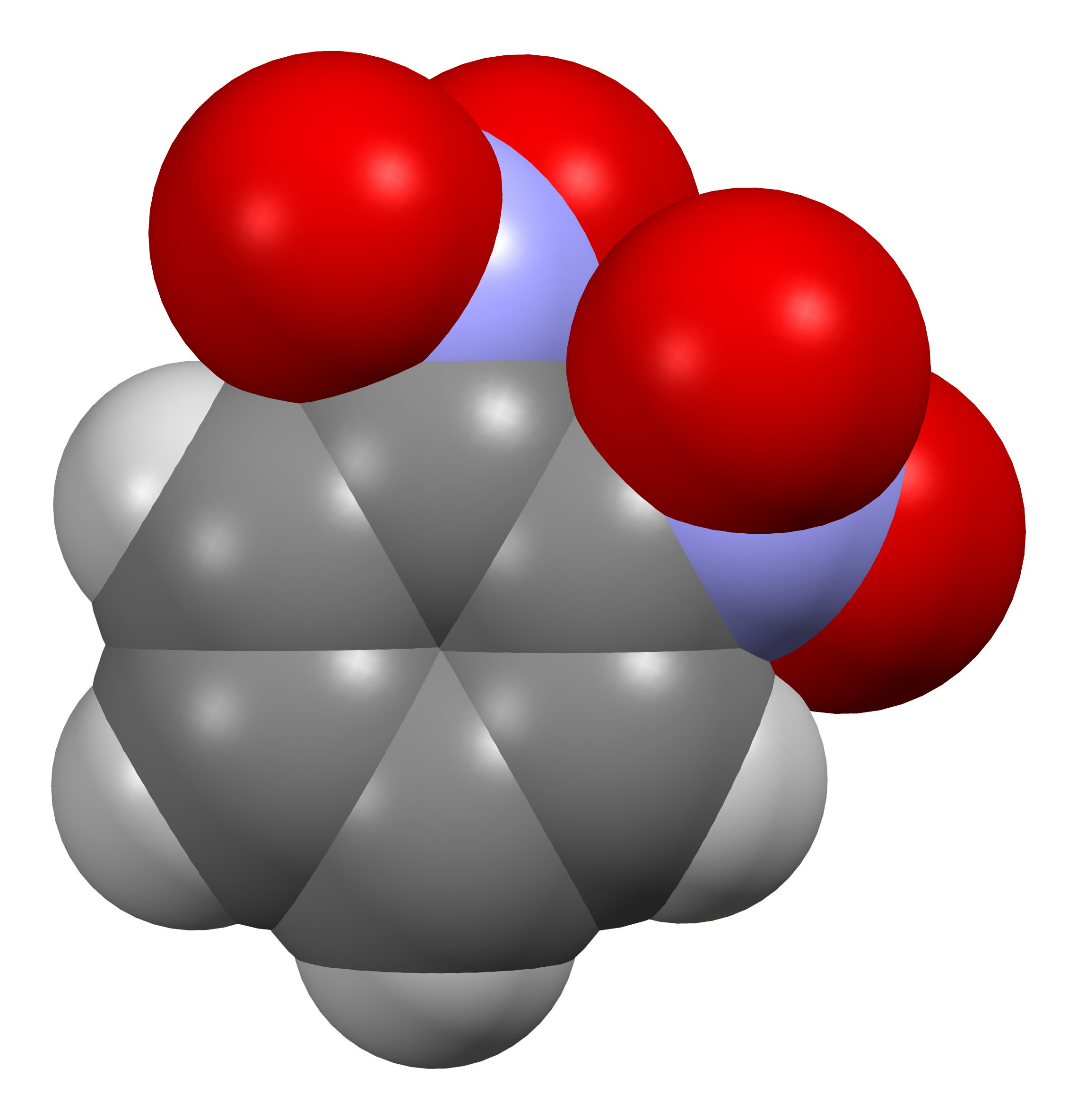

Names
- Preferred IUPAC name 1,2-Dinitrobenzene
- Other names ortho-dinitrobenzene

Identifiers
CAS Number	528-29-0
3D model (JSmol)	Interactive image
ChEMBL	ChEMBL168075
ChemSpider	10257
ECHA InfoCard	100.007.666
EC Number	208-431-8
PubChem CID	10707
RTECS number	CZ7450000
UNII	35XUO924Y0
UN number	3443 1597
CompTox Dashboard (EPA)	DTXSID4024066
- InChI: InChI=1S/C6H4N2O4/c9-7(10)5-3-1-2-4-6(5)8(11)12/h1-4H Key: IZUKQUVSCNEFMJ-UHFFFAOYSA-N
- SMILES: C1=CC=C(C(=C1)[N+](=O)[O-])[N+](=O)[O-]

Properties
Chemical formula	C_{6}H_{4}N_{2}O_{4}
Molar mass	168.108 g·mol^{−1}
Appearance	white solid
Density	1.565 g/cm^{3}
Melting point	118 °C (244 °F; 391 K)
Boiling point	318 °C (604 °F; 591 K)

Hazards
- GHS labelling
Pictograms	(GHS06: Toxic) (GHS08: Health hazard) (GHS09: Environmental hazard)
Signal word	Danger
Hazard statements	H300, H310, H330, H373, H410
Precautionary statements	P260, P262, P264, P270, P271, P273, P280, P284, P301+P310, P302+P350, P304+P340, P310, P314, P320, P321, P330, P361, P363, P391, P403+P233, P405, P501
- Except where otherwise noted, data are given for materials in their standard state (at 25 °C [77 °F], 100 kPa). Infobox references

1,2-Dinitrobenzene is one of three isomers of dinitrobenzene, with the formula C_{6}H_{4}(NO_{2})_{2}. The compound is a white or colorless solid that is soluble in organic solvents. It is prepared from 2-nitroaniline by diazotization and treatment with sodium nitrite in the presence of a copper catalyst.
