= 1,4-Dinitrobenzene =

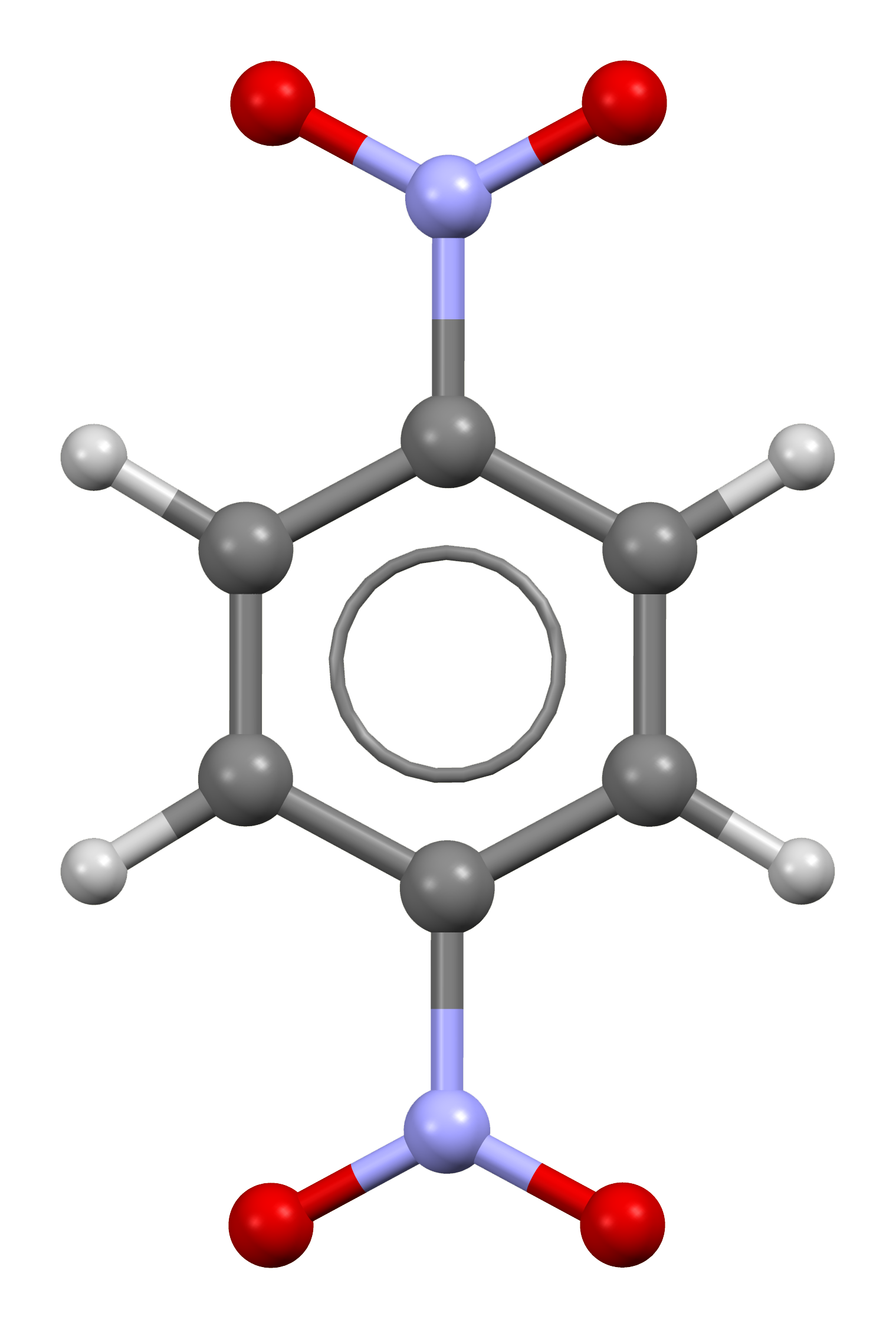

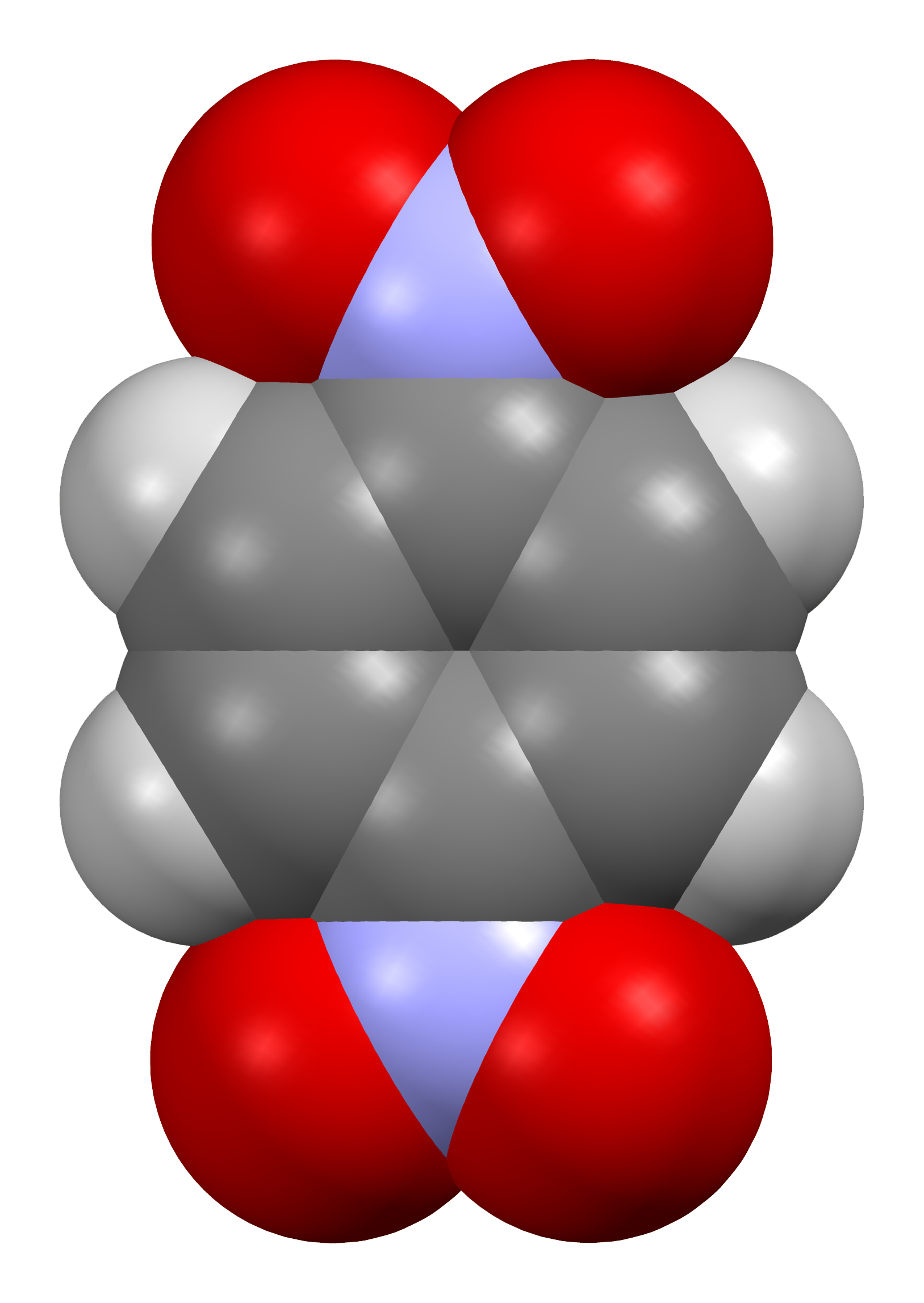

Names
- Preferred IUPAC name 1,4-Dinitrobenzene
- Other names para-dinitrobenzene

Identifiers
CAS Number	100-25-4
3D model (JSmol)	Interactive image
Beilstein Reference	1105828
ChemSpider	7211
ECHA InfoCard	100.002.576
EC Number	202-833-7
PubChem CID	7492
RTECS number	CZ7525000
UNII	784Q9O56S9
UN number	3443 1597
CompTox Dashboard (EPA)	DTXSID0021836
- InChI: InChI=1S/C6H4N2O4/c9-7(10)5-1-2-6(4-3-5)8(11)12/h1-4H Key: FYFDQJRXFWGIBS-UHFFFAOYSA-N
- SMILES: C1=CC(=CC=C1[N+](=O)[O-])[N+](=O)[O-]

Properties
Chemical formula	C_{6}H_{4}N_{2}O_{4}
Molar mass	168.108 g·mol^{−1}
Appearance	pale yellow solid
Density	1.625 g/cm^{3}
Melting point	173 °C (343 °F; 446 K)
Boiling point	299 °C (570 °F; 572 K)
Solubility in water	69 mg/L

Hazards
- GHS labelling
Pictograms	(GHS06: Toxic) (GHS08: Health hazard) (GHS09: Environmental hazard)
Signal word	Danger
Hazard statements	H300, H310, H330, H373, H410
Precautionary statements	P260, P262, P264, P270, P271, P273, P280, P284, P301+P310, P302+P350, P304+P340, P310, P314, P320, P321, P330, P361, P363, P391, P403+P233, P405, P501
Flash point	150 °C (302 °F; 423 K)
- Except where otherwise noted, data are given for materials in their standard state (at 25 °C [77 °F], 100 kPa). Infobox references

1,4-Dinitrobenzene is one of three isomers of dinitrobenzene, with the formula C_{6}H_{4}(NO_{2})_{2}. The 1,4-isomer is most symmetrical. The compound is a yellow solid that is soluble in organic solvents. It is prepared from 4-nitroaniline by diazotization followed by treatment with sodium nitrite in the presence of a copper catalyst.
