= Hydroxyaniline =

Hydroxyaniline, hydroxyaminobenzene, or hydroxybenzeneamine may refer to:

- N-Hydroxyaniline (N-hydroxybenzeneamine)
- Aminophenol
  - 2-Aminophenol
  - 3-Aminophenol
  - 4-Aminophenol
