= C6H7NO =

The molecular formula C_{6}H_{7}NO (molar mass: 109.13 g/mol) may refer to:

- Aminophenols
  - 2-Aminophenol
  - 3-Aminophenol
  - 4-Aminophenol
- Nicotinyl alcohol
- Phenylhydroxylamine
- Vince lactam
