= 4-nitrophenylphosphatase =

Class of enzymes

Identifiers
- EC no.: 3.1.3.41
- CAS no.: 9073-68-1

Databases
- BRENDA: enzyme data
- ExPASy: NiceZyme view
- KEGG: enzyme entry
- MetaCyc: metabolic pathway
- Rhea: reactions
- PDB structures: RCSB PDB PDBe PDBsum
- Gene Ontology: AmiGO / QuickGO
Search
- PMC: articles
- PubMed: articles
- NCBI: proteins

4-Nitrophenylphosphatase (EC 3.1.3.41) is an enzyme that catalyzes the reaction:

4-nitrophenyl phosphate
H_{2}O
P_{i}
4-nitrophenol

The enzyme characterised from baker's yeast hydrolyses 4-nitrophenyl phosphate to 4-nitrophenol and orthophosphate. The enzyme interacts with amyloid precursor protein.

This enzyme is a hydrolase, specifically one that acts on phosphoric monoester bonds. The systematic name of this enzyme class is 4-nitrophenylphosphate phosphohydrolase. Other names for this enzyme include nitrophenyl phosphatase, p-nitrophenylphosphatase, para-nitrophenyl phosphatase, K-pNPPase, NPPase, PNPPase, ecto-p-nitrophenyl phosphatase, and p-nitrophenylphosphate phosphohydrolase.

== Structural studies ==
As of late 2007, only one three-dimensional structure had been determined for this class of enzymes. The structure is available in the Protein Data Bank (PDB) under the accession code 1VJR.
