= C5H4N2O3 =

The molecular formula C_{5}H_{4}N_{2}O_{3} (molar mass: 140.10 g/mol, exact mass: 140.0222 u) may refer to:

- 5-Formyluracil
- 4-Nitropyridine-N-oxide
