= C12H17N3O2 =

The molecular formula C_{12}H_{17}N_{3}O_{2} (molar mass: 235.28 g/mol; exact mass: 235.132077 u) may refer to:

- Formparanate
- Inidascamine
