= C17H19NO2 =

The molecular formula C_{17}H_{19}NO_{2} may refer to:

- Mepronil
- Methylenedioxybenzylamphetamine
