= 3-Aminophenol =

Skeletal formula
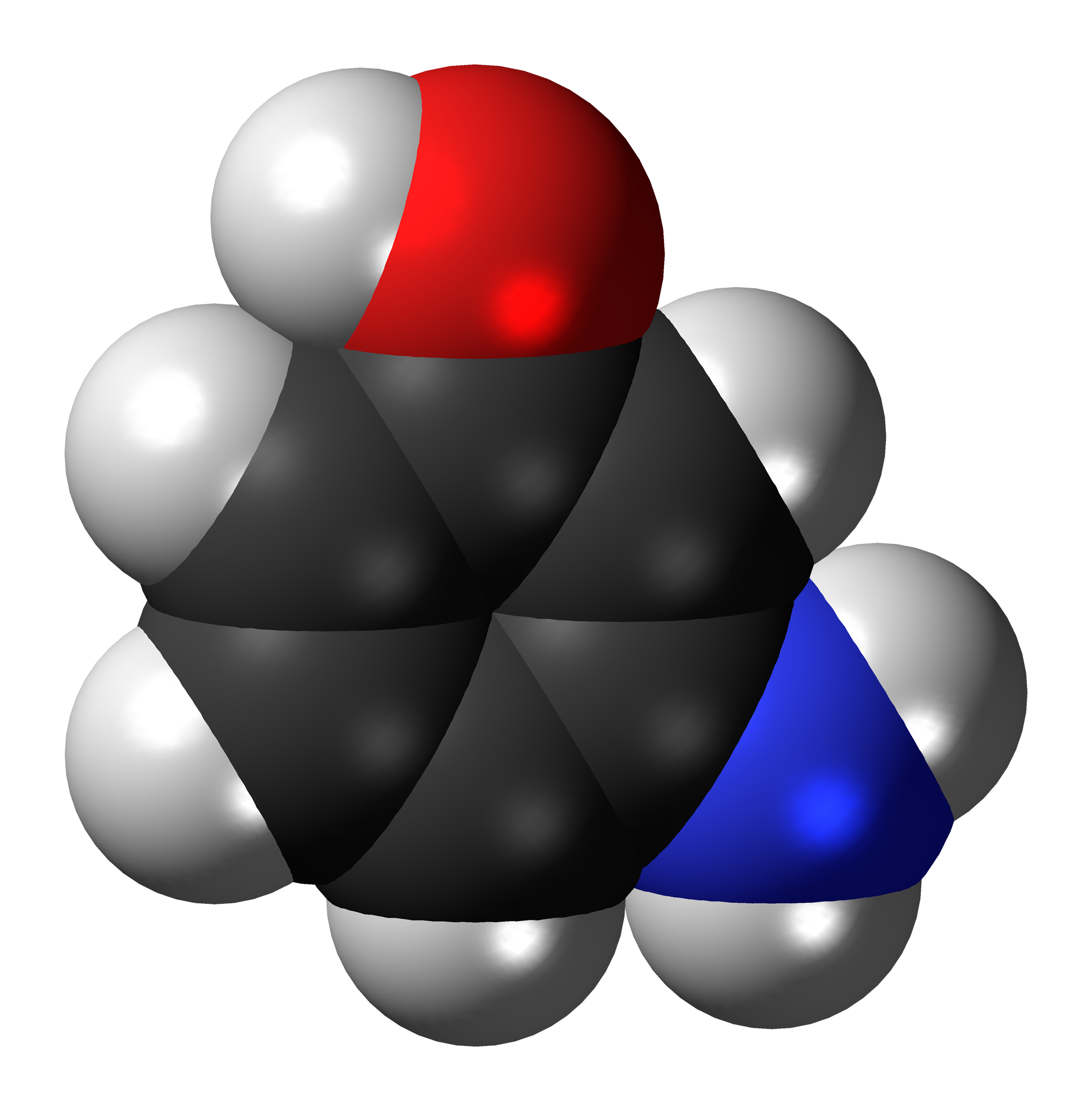

Names
- Preferred IUPAC name 3-Aminophenol
- Other names m-Aminophenol meta-Aminophenol; 3-Hydroxyaniline m-Hydroxyaniline meta-Hydroxyaniline

Identifiers
CAS Number	591-27-5
3D model (JSmol)	Interactive image
Beilstein Reference	636059
ChEBI	CHEBI:28924
ChEMBL	ChEMBL269755; ChEMBL376136
ChemSpider	11080
ECHA InfoCard	100.008.830
EC Number	209-711-2
Gmelin Reference	2913
KEGG	C05058
PubChem CID	11568
RTECS number	SJ4900000
UNII	L3WTS6QT82
UN number	2512
CompTox Dashboard (EPA)	DTXSID3024497
- InChI: InChI=1S/C6H7NO/c7-5-2-1-3-6(8)4-5/h1-4,8H,7H2 Key: CWLKGDAVCFYWJK-UHFFFAOYSA-N; InChI=1/C6H7NO/c7-5-2-1-3-6(8)4-5/h1-4,8H,7H2 Key: CWLKGDAVCFYWJK-UHFFFAOYAM
- SMILES: Oc1cccc(N)c1

Properties
Chemical formula	C_{6}H_{7}NO
Molar mass	109.128 g·mol^{−1}
Appearance	White orthorhombic crystals
Density	1.195 g/cm^{3}
Melting point	120 to 124 °C (248 to 255 °F; 393 to 397 K)
Boiling point	164 °C (327 °F; 437 K) at 11 mmHg
Acidity (pK_{a})	4.37 (amino; 20 °C, H_{2}O); 9.82 (phenol; 20 °C, H_{2}O)

Hazards
- GHS labelling
Pictograms	(GHS07: Exclamation mark) (GHS09: Environmental hazard)
Signal word	Warning
Hazard statements	H302, H332, H411
Precautionary statements	P261, P264, P270, P271, P273, P301+P312, P304+P312, P304+P340, P312, P330, P391, P501
NFPA 704 (fire diamond)	2 0 0
- Except where otherwise noted, data are given for materials in their standard state (at 25 °C [77 °F], 100 kPa). verify (what is ?) Infobox references

3-Aminophenol is an organic compound with formula C_{6}H_{4}(NH_{2})(OH). It is an aromatic amine and a phenol. It is the meta isomer of 2-aminophenol and 4-aminophenol.

== Preparation ==
3-Aminophenol is prepared by reduction of 3-nitrophenol. It can also be prepared by caustic fusion of 3-aminobenzenesulfonic acid (i.e. heating with NaOH to 245 °C for 6 hours) or from resorcinol via a substitution reaction with ammonium hydroxide.

== Uses ==
One of the most relevant applications of the substance is the synthesis of 3-(diethylamino)phenol, which is used for the preparation of several fluorescent dyes (e.g., rhodamine B). Other uses for the compound include hair dye colorants and stabilizers for chlorine-containing thermoplastics.

4-Aminosalicylic acid (PAS) is made by the Kolbe–Schmitt reaction of 3-aminophenol.

Some pesticides made from 3-aminophenol include the following: Formetanate, Mepronil, Karbutilate, Phenmedipham, Desmedipham & Phenisopham.
