= 4-aminobenzoate 1-monooxygenase =

Class of enzymes

Identifiers
- EC no.: 1.14.13.27
- CAS no.: 98668-55-4

Databases
- BRENDA: enzyme data
- ExPASy: NiceZyme view
- KEGG: enzyme entry
- MetaCyc: metabolic pathway
- Rhea: reactions
- PDB structures: RCSB PDB PDBe PDBsum
- Gene Ontology: AmiGO / QuickGO
Search
- PMC: articles
- PubMed: articles
- NCBI: proteins

4-aminobenzoate 1-monooxygenase (EC 1.14.13.27) is an enzyme that catalyzes the chemical reaction

4-Aminobenzoic acid
+ NADH + H^{+}
O_{2}
H_{2}O
4-Aminophenol
+ NAD^{+} + CO_{2}

The four substrates of this enzyme are 4-aminobenzoic acid, reduced nicotinamide adenine dinucleotide (NADH), oxygen and a proton. Its products are 4-aminophenol, oxidised NAD^{+}, water, and carbon dioxide. Nicotinamide adenine dinucleotide phosphate can be used as an alternative cofactor.

The enzyme is a flavin-containing monooxygenase that uses molecular oxygen as oxidant and incorporates one of its atoms into the starting material. The systematic name of this enzyme class is 4-aminobenzoate,NAD(P)H:oxygen oxidoreductase (1-hydroxylating, decarboxylating). Other names in common use include 4-aminobenzoate hydroxylase, and 4-aminobenzoate monooxygenase. It uses flavin adenine dinucleotide as a cofactor.
