= C14H21N3O3 =

The molecular formula C_{14}H_{21}N_{3}O_{3} may refer to:

- Oxamniquine
- Karbutilate
