= C26H33NO2 =

The molecular formula C_{26}H_{33}NO_{2} (molar mass: 391.54 g/mol) may refer to:

- Abiraterone acetate, an antiandrogen medication used to treat prostate cancer
- Fenretinide, a synthetic retinoid derivative
