= 2-nitrophenol 2-monooxygenase =

Class of enzymes

Identifiers
- EC no.: 1.14.13.31
- CAS no.: 104520-84-5

Databases
- IntEnz: IntEnz view
- BRENDA: BRENDA entry
- ExPASy: NiceZyme view
- KEGG: KEGG entry
- MetaCyc: metabolic pathway
- PRIAM: profile
- PDB structures: RCSB PDB PDBe PDBsum
- Gene Ontology: AmiGO / QuickGO
Search
- PMC: articles
- PubMed: articles
- NCBI: proteins

2-nitrophenol 2-monooxygenase (EC 1.14.13.31) is an enzyme that catalyzes the chemical reaction

2-nitrophenol
+ 2 NADPH + 2 H^{+}
O_{2}
H_{2}O
catechol
+ 2 NADP^{+} + HNO_{2}

The four substrates of this enzyme are 2-nitrophenol, reduced nicotinamide adenine dinucleotide phosphate (NADPH), oxygen and a proton. Its products are catechol, oxidised NADP^{+}, water, and nitrous acid.

This enzyme belongs to the family of oxidoreductases, specifically those acting on paired donors, with molecular oxygen as oxidant and incorporation of one of its atoms into the starting material. The systematic name of this enzyme class is 2-nitrophenol,NADPH:oxygen 2-oxidoreductase (2-hydroxylating, nitrite-forming). Other names in common use include 2-nitrophenol oxygenase, and nitrophenol oxygenase.
