= Rodinal =

Photographic developer

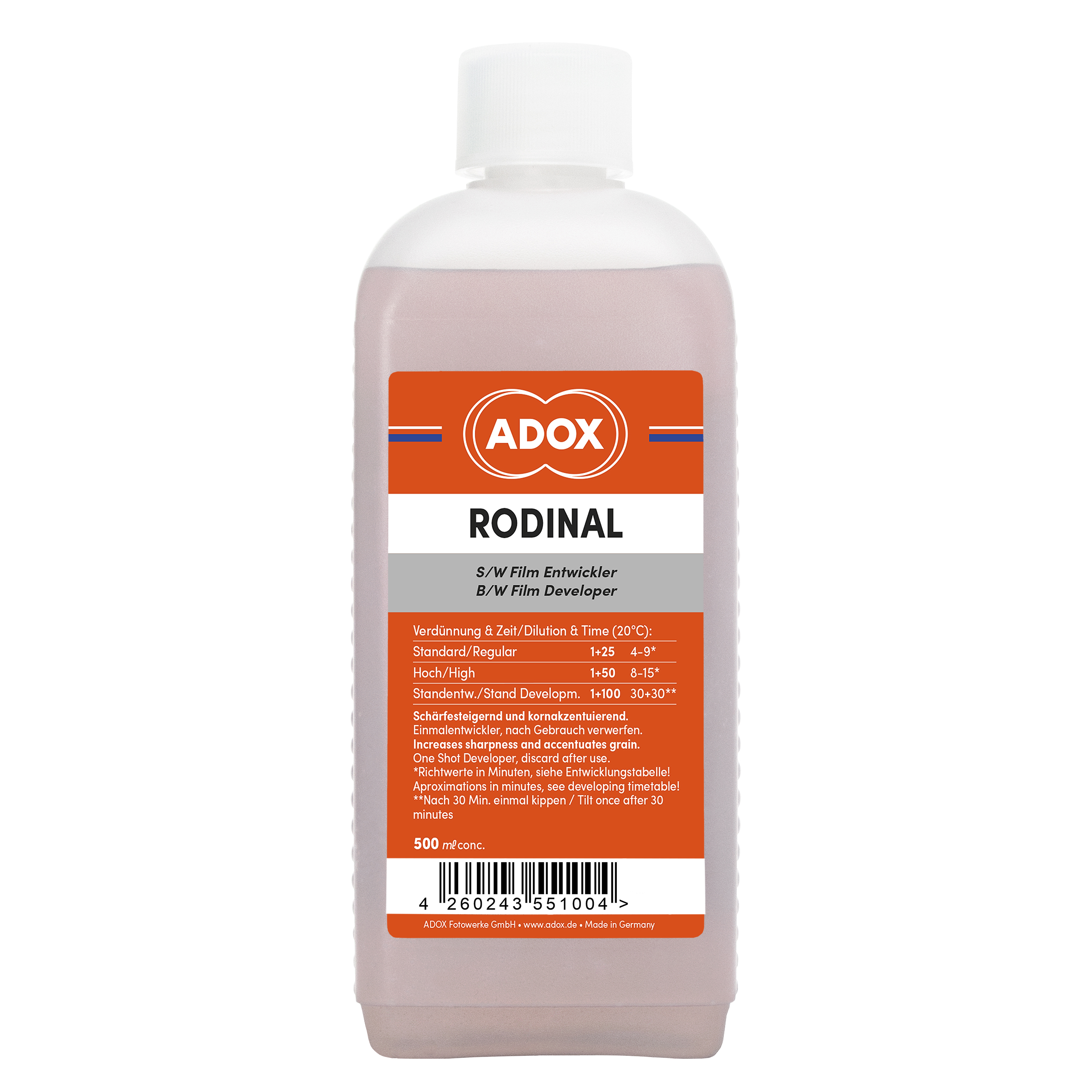
RODINAL

Rodinal is the trade name of a black and white developing agent produced originally by the German company Agfa based on the chemical 4-aminophenol. Rodinal is a popular high acutance black and white developer and is used at different dilutions for development in rotary machines, by agitation, as well as for stand development.

== History ==
Rodinal was patented on 27 January 1891, making it the oldest film developer which is still commercially available. Novel at the time of its invention was that it is delivered as a liquid concentrate that had to be diluted and not as a powder. By changing the dilution the development speed can be greatly changed.

This invention is the longest sold product for photography and is listed as such in the book of Guinness World Records.

During the division of Germany the original manufacturer Agfa was split, becoming the ORWO company in East Germany, where Rodinal was sold under the name ORWO R09.

After the insolvency of AgfaPhoto in 2005, production was taken over by the re-formed ADOX, which also purchased the trademark rights in the name in Europe (excluding France) and continues to sell the product under this name.

== Chemical components ==
Modern Rodinal contains the following chemicals as its main components:

- 4-Aminophenol as the developing substance
- Potassium hydroxide to control the pH
- Potassium sulfite
- EDTA acid
- Potassium bromide

== Use ==
Rodinal is sold as a concentrate and has to be diluted before use. Typical dilutions are 1+25 (1 part Rodinal, 25 parts water), 1+50 and 1+100. Higher dilutions increase development time while making the film appear sharper due to the Eberhard effect. Dilutions of 1+100 upward are used for Stand development. Diluted Rodinal, once used, should not be reused.

By increasing the temperature development can be sped up, while increasing the development time increases contrast and film grain.

== Durability ==
According to Agfa, dilutions should quickly be used as concentrated Rodinal quickly oxidises and becomes more brown, while fresh Rodinal is clear and colourless. After taking some concentrate from the container it should be filled up with a gas heavier than air or filled up with glass marbles until the container is full again to prevent oxidization.

Rodinal has proven to be a very long-lived developer. Even deeply brown Rodinal should still work as usual. On the floor of the bottle there may be some crystals which do not diminish the durability or effectiveness but should be filtered out before use, for example with a coffee filter.

The shelf life of rodinal is one of its more notable qualities. While Adox - the current manufacturer of Rodinal - suggests that the concentrated solution can last six months when opened, anecdotal evidence shows that Rodinal can be used normally even 50 or more years after its expiry.

== See also ==
- Film development
