= PNP agar =

PNP Agar is an agar medium used in microbiology to identify Staphylococcus species that have phosphatase activity. The medium changes color when p-nitrophenylphosphate disodium (PNP) is dephosphorylated.

PNP agar is composed of Mueller–Hinton agar buffered to pH 5.6 to 5.8, with the addition of 0.495 mg/mL PNP.
