= C6H9N3O2 =

The molecular formula C_{6}H_{9}N_{3}O_{2} (molar mass: 155.15 g/mol, exact mass: 155.0695 u) may refer to:

- Cupferron
- Histidine (His or H)
