= P-benzoquinone reductase (NADPH) =

p-benzoquinone reductase (NADPH)

Identifiers
- EC no.: 1.6.5.6

Databases
- IntEnz: IntEnz view
- BRENDA: BRENDA entry
- ExPASy: NiceZyme view
- KEGG: KEGG entry
- MetaCyc: metabolic pathway
- PRIAM: profile
- PDB structures: RCSB PDB PDBe PDBsum
- Gene Ontology: AmiGO / QuickGO
Search
- PMC: articles
- PubMed: articles
- NCBI: proteins

p-benzoquinone reductase (NADPH) (EC 1.6.5.6) is an enzyme that catalyzes the chemical reaction

p-benzoquinone
+ NADPH
H^{+}
H^{+}
hydroquinone
+ NADP^{+}

The three substrates of this enzyme are p-benzoquinone. reduced nicotinamide adenine dinucleotide phosphate (NADPH), and a proton. Its products are hydroquinone and NADP^{+}.

This enzyme belongs to the family of oxidoreductases, specifically those acting on NADH or NADPH with a quinone or similar compound as acceptor. The systematic name of this enzyme class is NADPH:p-benzoquinone oxidoreductase. This enzyme participates in the metabolism of 4-nitrophenol in a Moraxella species of bacteria.
