= 4-Nitrophenol 4-monooxygenase =

Class of enzymes

4-nitrophenol 4-monooxygenase

Identifiers
- EC no.: 1.14.13.167

Databases
- IntEnz: IntEnz view
- BRENDA: BRENDA entry
- ExPASy: NiceZyme view
- KEGG: KEGG entry
- MetaCyc: metabolic pathway
- PRIAM: profile
- PDB structures: RCSB PDB PDBe PDBsum
Search
- PMC: articles
- PubMed: articles
- NCBI: proteins

4-nitrophenol 4-monooxygenase (EC 1.14.13.167, pnpA (gene), pdcA (gene)) is an enzyme with systematic name 4-nitrophenol,NAD(P)H:oxygen 4-oxidoreductase (4-hydroxylating, nitrite-forming). This enzyme catalyses the following chemical reaction

4-Nitrophenol
+ NADPH
O_{2} + H^{+}
H_{2}O
1,4-Benzoquinone
+ NADP^{+} + HNO_{2}

The four substrates of this enzyme are 4-nitrophenol, reduced nicotinamide adenine dinucleotide phosphate (NADPH), oxygen, and a proton. Its products are 1,4-benzoquinone, oxidised NADP^{+}, water, and nitrous acid. It is a flavoprotein that uses flavin adenine dinucleotide as a cofactor.
