= Aminophenol =

The three aminophenol isomers: Left: 2-Aminophenol (o-aminophenol) Center: 3-Aminophenol (m-aminophenol) Right: 4-Aminophenol (p-aminophenol)

Aminophenol may refer to any of three isomeric chemical compounds:

- 2-Aminophenol
- 3-Aminophenol
- 4-Aminophenol

They are simultaneously an aniline and a phenol.
