= 4-Nitropyridine-N-oxide =

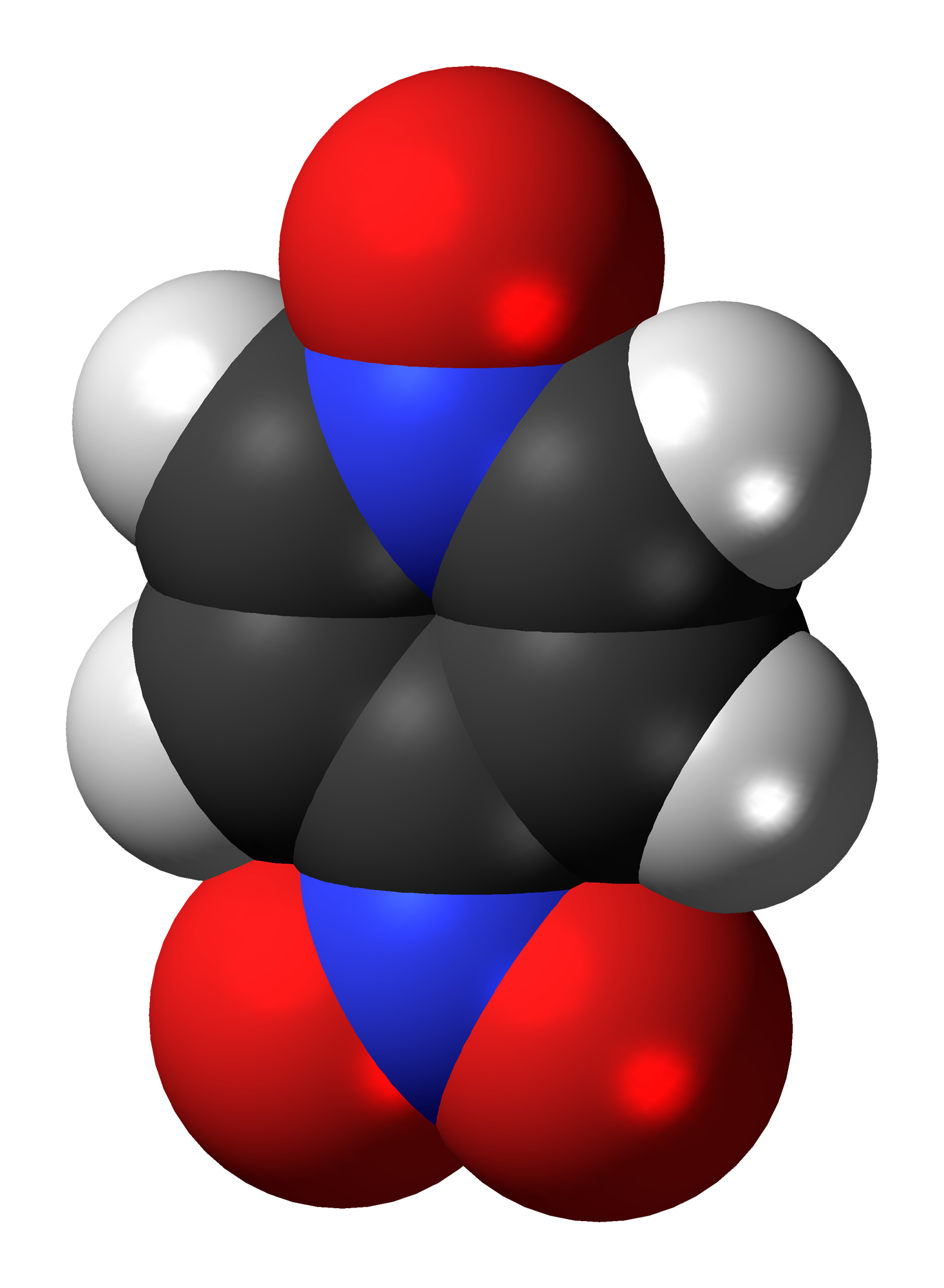

Names
- Preferred IUPAC name 4-Nitropyridin-1-ium-1-olate

Identifiers
CAS Number	1124-33-0
3D model (JSmol)	Interactive image
ChemSpider	13662
ECHA InfoCard	100.013.088
PubChem CID	14300
UNII	ULB29Z652D
CompTox Dashboard (EPA)	DTXSID9041524
- InChI: InChI=1S/C5H4N2O3/c8-6-3-1-5(2-4-6)7(9)10/h1-4H Key: RXKNNAKAVAHBNK-UHFFFAOYSA-N; InChI=1/C5H4N2O3/c8-6-3-1-5(2-4-6)7(9)10/h1-4H Key: RXKNNAKAVAHBNK-UHFFFAOYAT
- SMILES: c1c[n+](ccc1[N+](=O)[O-])[O-]

Properties
Chemical formula	C_{5}H_{4}N_{2}O_{3}
Molar mass	140.098 g·mol^{−1}

Structure
Space group	Pnma
- Except where otherwise noted, data are given for materials in their standard state (at 25 °C [77 °F], 100 kPa). Infobox references

4-Nitropyridine-N-oxide is a chemical compound, crystallizing in space group Pnma.

It is highly toxic when consumed orally. It is also weakly carcinogenic, requiring a pre-existing oncovirus infection to have any effect.

E. coli bacteria struggle to sense quorum in the presence of para-nitropyridine oxide, and the compound physically prevents P. aeruginosa from adhering to surfaces.

para-Nitropyridine oxide also forms cocrystals. The cocrystal with mercuric chloride links together the molecular π systems, generating a large third harmonic response. The 1:1 cocrystal with nitrophenol also exhibits nonlinear optical effects, presumably due to strong hydrogen bonding.
