= Cupferron =

- Cupferron

Names
- Other names cupferron ammonium N-nitrosophenylhydroxylamine

Identifiers
| CAS Number | 135-20-6 |
| 3D model (JSmol) | Interactive image |
| ChemSpider | 2006262 |
| ECHA InfoCard | 100.004.713 |
| EC Number | 205-183-2 |
| PubChem CID | 2724103 |
| UNII | V66QK963ED |
| CompTox Dashboard (EPA) | DTXSID1020352 |
- InChI: InChI=1S/C6H5N2O2.H3N/c9-7-8(10)6-4-2-1-3-5-6;/h1-5H;1H3/q-1;/p+1 Key: GDEBSAWXIHEMNF-UHFFFAOYSA-O; InChI=1/C6H5N2O2.H3N/c9-7-8(10)6-4-2-1-3-5-6;/h1-5H;1H3/q-1;/p+1 Key: GDEBSAWXIHEMNF-IKLDFBCSAP
- SMILES: O=NN([O-])c1ccccc1.[NH4+]

Properties
| Chemical formula | C_{6}H_{9}N_{3}O_{2} |
| Molar mass | 155.157 g·mol^{−1} |
| Melting point | 150 to 155 °C (302 to 311 °F; 423 to 428 K) |
| Solubility in water | Soluble |

Hazards
- GHS labelling
| Pictograms | (GHS06: Toxic) (GHS07: Exclamation mark) (GHS08: Health hazard) |
| Signal word | Danger |
| Hazard statements | H301, H315, H319, H335, H351 |
| Precautionary statements | P201, P202, P261, P264, P270, P271, P280, P281, P301+P310, P302+P352, P304+P340, P305+P351+P338, P308+P313, P312, P321, P330, P332+P313, P337+P313, P362, P403+P233, P405, P501 |
- Except where otherwise noted, data are given for materials in their standard state (at 25 °C [77 °F], 100 kPa). verify (what is ?) Infobox references

Cupferron is jargon for the ammonium salt of the conjugate base derived from N-nitroso-N-phenylhydroxylamine. Its formula is NH_{4}[C_{6}H_{5}N(O)NO]. The anion, abbreviated CU^{−}, is a NONOate. It once was a common qualitative inorganic analysis reagent, binding metal ions into brightly colored complexes. The metals bond through the two oxygen atoms, forming five-membered chelate rings.

== Synthesis and complexes ==
Structure of ferric cupferron complex

Cupferron is prepared from phenylhydroxylamine and an NO^{+} source:

C_{6}H_{5}NHOH + C_{4}H_{9}ONO + NH_{3} → NH_{4}[C_{6}H_{5}N(O)NO] + C_{4}H_{9}OH

Being a bidentate mono-anionic ligand, CU^{−} forms complexes analogous to those produced with acetylacetonate. Illustrative complexes include Cu(CU)_{2}, Fe(CU)_{3}, and Zr(CU)_{4}.

== See also ==
- Nitroso
- N-nitroso
- Hydroxamate
- Phenylhydroxylamine
