= Nitric oxide =

Colorless gas with the formula NO

- Skeletal formula of nitric oxide with bond length

Skeletal formula showing two lone pairs and one three-electron bond
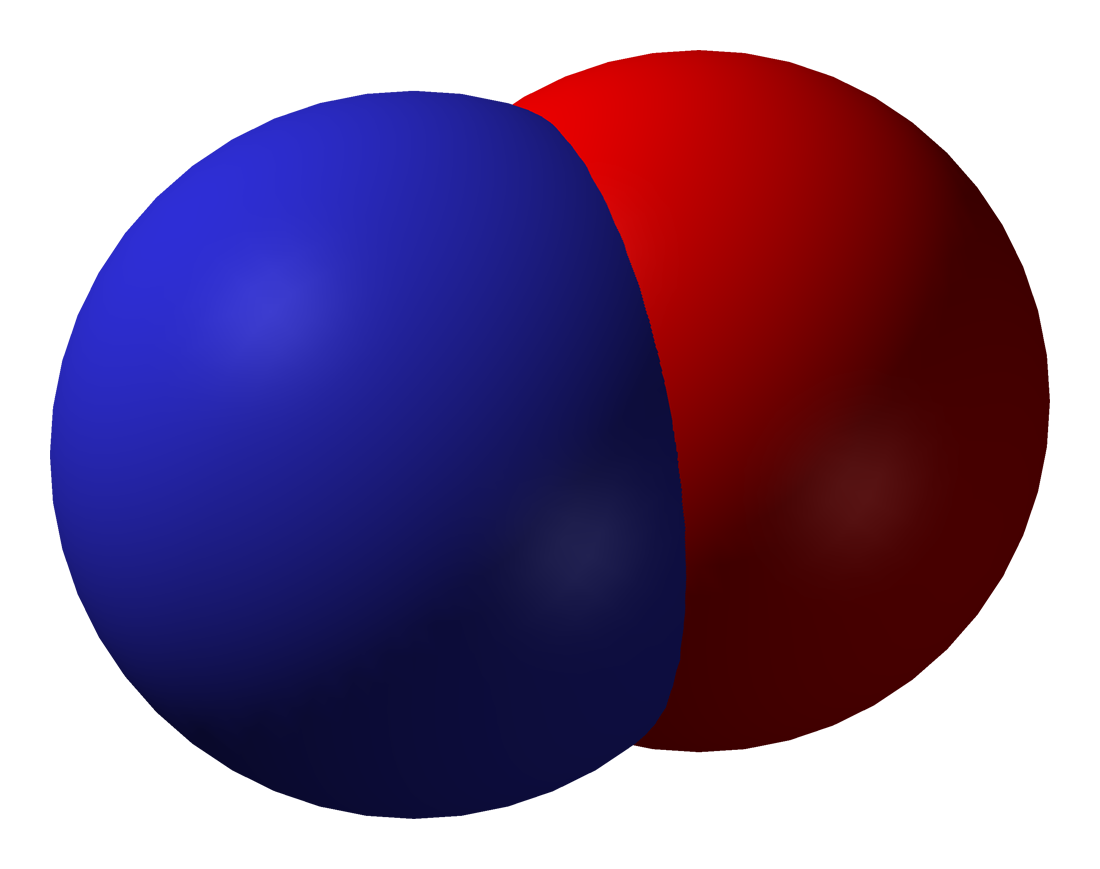
Space-filling model of nitric oxide

Names
- IUPAC name Nitrogen monoxide
- Systematic IUPAC name Oxidonitrogen(•) (additive)
- Other names Nitrogen oxide Nitrogen(II) oxide Oxonitrogen; Nitrogen monoxide

Identifiers
CAS Number	10102-43-9
3D model (JSmol)	Interactive image
ChEBI	CHEBI:16480
ChEMBL	ChEMBL1200689
ChemSpider	127983
DrugBank	DB00435
ECHA InfoCard	100.030.233
EC Number	233-271-0
Gmelin Reference	451
IUPHAR/BPS	2509
KEGG	D00074
PubChem CID	145068
RTECS number	QX0525000
UNII	31C4KY9ESH
UN number	1660
CompTox Dashboard (EPA)	DTXSID1020938
- InChI: InChI=1S/NO/c1-2 Key: MWUXSHHQAYIFBG-UHFFFAOYSA-N; InChI=1/NO/c1-2 Key: MWUXSHHQAYIFBG-UHFFFAOYAI
- SMILES: [N]=O

Properties
Chemical formula	NO
Molar mass	30.006 g·mol^{−1}
Appearance	Colourless gas
Density	1.3402 g/L
Melting point	−164 °C (−263 °F; 109 K)
Boiling point	−152 °C (−242 °F; 121 K)
Solubility in water	0.0098 g / 100 mL (0 °C); 0.0056 g / 100 mL (20 °C)
Refractive index (n_{D})	1.0002697

Structure
Molecular shape	linear (point group C_{∞v})

Thermochemistry
Std molar entropy (S^{⦵}_{298})	210.76 J/(K·mol)
Std enthalpy of formation (Δ_{f}H^{⦵}_{298})	+90.29 kJ/mol

Pharmacology
ATC code	R07AX01 (WHO)
License data	EU EMA: by INN
Routes of administration	Inhalation
- Pharmacokinetics
Bioavailability	good
Metabolism	via pulmonary capillary bed
Biological half-life	2–6 seconds

Hazards
- Occupational safety and health (OHS/OSH)
Main hazards	Very toxic, corrosive, oxidizer
- GHS labelling
Pictograms	(GHS03: Oxidizing) (GHS05: Corrosive) (GHS06: Toxic)
Signal word	Danger
Hazard statements	H270, H314, H330
Precautionary statements	P220, P244, P260, P280, P303+P361+P353+P315, P304+P340+P315, P305+P351+P338+P315, P370+P376, P403, P405
NFPA 704 (fire diamond)	3 0 3 OX
- Lethal dose or concentration (LD, LC)
LC_{50} (median concentration)	315 ppm (rabbit, 15 min); 854 ppm (rat, 4 h); 2500 ppm (mouse, 12 min)
LC_{Lo} (lowest published)	320 ppm (mouse)
Safety data sheet (SDS)	External SDS

Related compounds
Related nitrogen oxides	Dinitrogen pentoxide Dinitrogen tetroxide Dinitrogen trioxide Nitrogen dioxide Nitrous oxide Nitroxyl (reduced form); Hydroxylamine (hydrogenated form)
- Except where otherwise noted, data are given for materials in their standard state (at 25 °C [77 °F], 100 kPa). verify (what is ?) Infobox references

Nitric oxide (nitrogen oxide, nitrogen mono-oxide, or nitrogen monoxide) is a colorless gas with the formula NO. It is one of the principal oxides of nitrogen. Nitric oxide is a free radical: it has an unpaired electron, which is sometimes denoted by a dot in its chemical formula (^{•}N=O or ^{•}NO). Nitric oxide is also a heteronuclear diatomic molecule, a class of molecules whose study spawned early modern theories of chemical bonding.

An important intermediate in industrial chemistry, nitric oxide forms in combustion systems and can be generated by lightning in thunderstorms. High temperatures of hydrogen combustion in an oxygen-rich environment, with atmospheric nitrogen present, can also result in breaking of N≡N bonds, forming toxic NOx if no exhaust scrubbing is done. In mammals, including humans, nitric oxide is a signaling molecule in many physiological and pathological processes. It was proclaimed the "Molecule of the Year" in 1992. The 1998 Nobel Prize in Physiology or Medicine was awarded for discovering nitric oxide's role as a cardiovascular signalling molecule. Its impact extends beyond biology, with applications in medicine, such as the development of sildenafil (Viagra), and in industry, including semiconductor manufacturing.

Nitric oxide should not be confused with nitrogen dioxide (NO_{2}), a brown gas and major air pollutant, or with nitrous oxide (N_{2}O), an anaesthetic gas.

== History ==
Nitric oxide (NO) was first identified by Joseph Priestley in the late 18th century, originally seen as merely a toxic byproduct of combustion and an environmental pollutant. Its biological significance was later uncovered in the 1980s when researchers Robert F. Furchgott, Louis J. Ignarro, and Ferid Murad discovered its critical role as a vasodilator in the cardiovascular system, a breakthrough that earned them the 1998 Nobel Prize in Physiology or Medicine.

== Physical properties ==
=== Electronic configuration ===
The ground-state electronic configuration of NO in united-atom notation is
$$(1\sigma)^2 (2\sigma)^2 (3\sigma)^2 (4\sigma^*)^2 (5\sigma)^2 (1\pi)^4 (2\pi^*)^1.$$
The first two orbitals are actually pure atomic 1s_{O} and 1s_{N} from oxygen and nitrogen respectively and therefore are usually not noted in the united-atom notation. Orbitals noted with an asterisk are antibonding. The ordering of 5σ and 1π according to their binding energies is subject to discussion. Removal of a 1π electron leads to 6 states whose energies span over a range starting at a lower level than a 5σ electron and extending to a higher level. This is due to the different orbital momentum couplings between a 1π and a 2π electron.

The lone electron in the 2π orbital makes NO a doublet (X ^{2}Π) in its ground state, whose degeneracy is split in the fine structure from spin–orbit coupling with a total momentum J = 3/2 or J = 1/2.

=== Dipole ===
The dipole of NO has been measured experimentally to 0.15740 D and is oriented from O to N (^{−}NO^{+}) due to the transfer of negative electronic charge from oxygen to nitrogen.

== Reactions ==
=== With di- and triatomic molecules ===
Upon condensing to a liquid, nitric oxide dimerizes to colorless dinitrogen dioxide (O=N–N=O), but the association is weak and reversible. The N–N distance in crystalline NO is 218 pm, nearly twice the N–O distance. Condensation in a highly polar environment instead gives the red alternant isomer O=N–O^{+}=N^{−}.

Since the heat of formation of ^{•}NO is endothermic, NO can be decomposed to the elements. Catalytic converters in cars exploit this reaction:

2 ^{•}NO → O_{2} + N_{2}

When exposed to oxygen, nitric oxide converts into nitrogen dioxide:

2 ^{•}NO + O_{2} → 2 ^{•}NO_{2}

This reaction is thought to occur via the intermediates ONOO^{•} and the red compound ONOONO.

In water, nitric oxide reacts with oxygen to form nitrous acid (HNO_{2}). The reaction is thought to proceed via the following stoichiometry:

4 ^{•}NO + O_{2} + 2 H_{2}O → 4 HNO_{2}

Nitric oxide reacts with fluorine, chlorine, and bromine to form the nitrosyl halides, such as nitrosyl chloride:

2 ^{•}NO + Cl_{2} → 2 NOCl

With NO_{2}, also a radical, NO combines to form the intensely blue dinitrogen trioxide:

^{•}NO + ^{•}NO_{2} ⇌ ON−NO_{2}

=== Organic chemistry ===
Nitric oxide rarely sees organic chemistry use. Most reactions with it produce complex mixtures of salts, separable only through careful recrystallization.

The addition of a nitric oxide moiety to another molecule is often referred to as nitrosylation. The Traube reaction is the addition of a two equivalents of nitric oxide as electrophile onto an enolate, giving a diazeniumdiolate (also called a nitrosohydroxylamine). The product can undergo an acyl substitution reaction, giving an overall process similar to the haloform reaction. For example, nitric oxide reacts with acetone and an alkoxide to form a double diazeniumdiolate on one of the α positions, with subsequent loss of methyl acetate as a by-product:

This reaction, which was discovered around 1898, remains of interest in nitric oxide prodrug research. Nitric oxide can also react directly with sodium methoxide, ultimately forming sodium formate and nitrous oxide by way of an N-methoxydiazeniumdiolate.

Sufficiently basic secondary amines undergo a Traube-like reaction to give NONOates. However, very few nucleophiles undergo the Traube reaction, either failing to react with NO or immediately decomposing with nitrous oxide release.

=== Coordination complexes ===
Nitric oxide reacts with transition metals to give complexes called metal nitrosyls. The most common bonding mode of nitric oxide is the terminal linear type (M−NO). Alternatively, nitric oxide can serve as a one-electron pseudohalide. In such complexes, the M−N−O group is characterized by an angle between 120° and 140°. The NO group can also bridge between metal centers through the nitrogen atom in a variety of geometries.

== Production and preparation ==
In commercial settings, nitric oxide is produced by the oxidation of ammonia at 750–900 °C (normally at 850 °C) with platinum as catalyst in the Ostwald process:

4 NH_{3} + 5 O_{2} → 4 ^{•}NO + 6 H_{2}O

The uncatalyzed endothermic reaction of oxygen (O_{2}) and nitrogen (N_{2}), which is effected at high temperature (>2000 °C) by lightning has not been developed into a practical commercial synthesis (see Birkeland–Eyde process):

N_{2} + O_{2} → 2 ^{•}NO

=== Laboratory methods ===
In the laboratory, nitric oxide is conveniently generated by reduction of dilute nitric acid with copper:

8 HNO_{3} + 3 Cu → 3 Cu(NO_{3})_{2} + 4 H_{2}O + 2 ^{•}NO

An alternative route involves the reduction of nitrous acid in the form of sodium nitrite or potassium nitrite:

2 NaNO_{2} + 2 NaI + 2 H_{2}SO_{4} → I_{2} + 2 Na_{2}SO_{4} + 2 H_{2}O + 2 ^{•}NO
2 NaNO_{2} + 2 FeSO_{4} + 3 H_{2}SO_{4} → Fe_{2}(SO_{4})_{3} + 2 NaHSO_{4} + 2 H_{2}O + 2 ^{•}NO
3 KNO_{2} + KNO_{3} + Cr_{2}O_{3} → 2 K_{2}CrO_{4} + 4 ^{•}NO

The iron(II) sulfate route is simple and has been used in undergraduate laboratory experiments.

So-called NONOate compounds are also used for nitric oxide generation, especially in biological laboratories. However, other Traube adducts may decompose to instead give nitrous oxide.

== Detection and assay ==
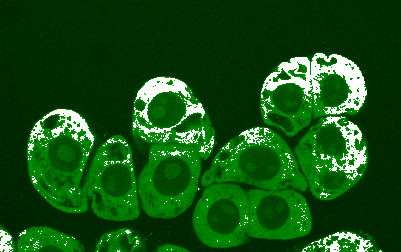
Nitric oxide (white) in conifer cells, visualized using DAF-2 DA (diaminofluorescein diacetate)

Nitric oxide concentration can be determined using a chemiluminescent reaction involving ozone. A sample containing nitric oxide is mixed with a large quantity of ozone. The nitric oxide reacts with the ozone to produce oxygen and nitrogen dioxide, accompanied with emission of light (chemiluminescence):

^{•}NO + O_{3} → ^{•}NO_{2} + O_{2} + hν

which can be measured with a photodetector. The amount of light produced is proportional to the amount of nitric oxide in the sample.

Other methods of testing include electroanalysis (amperometric approach), where ·NO reacts with an electrode to induce a current or voltage change. The detection of NO radicals in biological tissues is particularly difficult due to the short lifetime and concentration of these radicals in tissues. One of the few practical methods is spin trapping of nitric oxide with iron-dithiocarbamate complexes and subsequent detection of the mono-nitrosyl-iron complex with electron paramagnetic resonance (EPR).

A group of fluorescent dye indicators that are also available in acetylated form for intracellular measurements exist. The most common compound is 4,5-diaminofluorescein (DAF-2).

== Environmental effects ==
=== Acid rain deposition ===
Nitric oxide reacts with the hydroperoxyl radical (HO^{•}_{2}) to form nitrogen dioxide (NO_{2}), which then can react with a hydroxyl radical (HO^{•}) to produce nitric acid (HNO_{3}):

^{•}NO + HO^{•}_{2} → ^{•}NO_{2} + HO^{•}
^{•}NO_{2} + HO^{•} → HNO_{3}

Nitric acid, along with sulfuric acid, contributes to acid rain deposition.

=== Ozone depletion ===
^{•}NO participates in ozone layer depletion. Nitric oxide reacts with stratospheric ozone to form O_{2} and nitrogen dioxide:

^{•}NO + O_{3} → ^{•}NO_{2} + O_{2}

This reaction is also utilized to measure concentrations of ^{•}NO in control volumes.

=== Precursor to NO_{2} ===
As seen in the acid deposition section, nitric oxide can transform into nitrogen dioxide (this can happen with the hydroperoxy radical, HO^{•}_{2}, or diatomic oxygen, O_{2}). Symptoms of short-term nitrogen dioxide exposure include nausea, dyspnea and headache. Long-term effects could include impaired immune and respiratory function.

== Biological functions ==
NO is a gaseous signaling molecule. It is a key vertebrate biological messenger, playing a role in a variety of biological processes. It is a bioproduct in almost all types of organisms, including bacteria, plants, fungi, and animal cells.

Nitric oxide, an endothelium-derived relaxing factor (EDRF), is biosynthesized endogenously from L-arginine, oxygen, and NADPH by various nitric oxide synthase (NOS) enzymes. Reduction of inorganic nitrate may also make nitric oxide. One of the main enzymatic targets of nitric oxide is guanylyl cyclase. The binding of nitric oxide to the heme region of the enzyme leads to activation, in the presence of iron. Nitric oxide is highly reactive (having a lifetime of a few seconds), yet diffuses freely across membranes. These attributes make nitric oxide ideal for a transient paracrine (between adjacent cells) and autocrine (within a single cell) signaling molecule. Once nitric oxide is converted to nitrates and nitrites by oxygen and water, cell signaling is deactivated.

The endothelium (inner lining) of blood vessels uses nitric oxide to signal the surrounding smooth muscle to relax, resulting in vasodilation and increasing blood flow. Sildenafil (Viagra) is a drug that uses the nitric oxide pathway. Sildenafil does not produce nitric oxide, but enhances the signals that are downstream of the nitric oxide pathway by protecting cyclic guanosine monophosphate (cGMP) from degradation by cGMP-specific phosphodiesterase type 5 (PDE5) in the corpus cavernosum, allowing for the signal to be enhanced, and thus vasodilation. Another endogenous gaseous transmitter, hydrogen sulfide (H_{2}S) works with NO to induce vasodilation and angiogenesis in a cooperative manner.

Nasal breathing produces higher levels of exhaled nitric oxide compared to oral breathing.

== Occupational safety and health ==
In the U.S., the Occupational Safety and Health Administration (OSHA) has set the legal limit (permissible exposure limit) for nitric oxide exposure in the workplace as 25 ppm (30 mg/m^{3}) over an 8-hour workday. The National Institute for Occupational Safety and Health (NIOSH) has set a recommended exposure limit (REL) of 25 ppm (30 mg/m^{3}) over an 8-hour workday. At levels of 100 ppm, nitric oxide is immediately dangerous to life and health.

== Explosion hazard ==
Liquid nitrogen oxide is very sensitive to detonation even in the absence of fuel, and can be initiated as readily as nitroglycerin. Detonation of the endothermic liquid oxide close to its boiling point (−152 °C or −241.6 °F or 121.1 K) generated a 100 kbar pulse and fragmented the test equipment. It is the simplest molecule that is capable of detonation in all three phases. The liquid oxide is sensitive and may explode during distillation, and this has been the cause of industrial accidents. Gaseous nitric oxide detonates at about 2,300 metres per second (8,300 km/h; 5,100 mph), but as a solid it can reach a detonation velocity of 6,100 metres per second (22,000 km/h; 13,600 mph).
