= 5-Formyluracil =

Names
- Preferred IUPAC name 2,4-Dioxo-1,2,3,4-tetrahydropyrimidine-5-carbaldehyde

Identifiers
CAS Number	1195-08-0
3D model (JSmol)	Interactive image
ChEBI	CHEBI:80961
ChemSpider	269368
ECHA InfoCard	100.153.693
KEGG	C17206
PubChem CID	304590
UNII	F2SUM4W8EB
CompTox Dashboard (EPA)	DTXSID40922994
- InChI: InChI=1S/C5H4N2O3/c8-2-3-1-6-5(10)7-4(3)9/h1-2H,(H2,6,7,9,10) Key: OHAMXGZMZZWRCA-UHFFFAOYSA-N
- SMILES: O=CC1=CNC(=O)NC1=O

Properties
Chemical formula	C_{5}H_{4}N_{2}O_{3}
Molar mass	140.098 g·mol^{−1}

Hazards
- GHS labelling
Pictograms	(GHS07: Exclamation mark)
Signal word	Warning
Hazard statements	H315, H319, H335
Precautionary statements	P261, P264, P271, P280, P302+P352, P304+P340, P305+P351+P338, P312, P321, P332+P313, P337+P313, P362, P403+P233, P405, P501
- Except where otherwise noted, data are given for materials in their standard state (at 25 °C [77 °F], 100 kPa). Infobox references

5-Formyluracil is a heterocyclic organic base. It is produced from the oxidation of the methyl group of thymine. It is found in bacteriophages, prokaryotes, as well as mammalian cells. Being mutagenic, it is of particular interest in the field of epigenetics. It has been implicated in the formation of cancer causing cells.
