= Glutaurine =

Chemical compound

Names
- IUPAC name N^{5}-(2-Sulfoethyl)-L-glutamine
- Systematic IUPAC name (2S)-2-Amino-5-oxo-5-[(2-sulfoethyl)amino]pentanoic acid
- Other names γ-Glutamyltaurine; γ-GT; γ-L-Glutamyltaurine

Identifiers
CAS Number	56488-60-9
3D model (JSmol)	Interactive image
ChEMBL	ChEMBL2106758
ChemSpider	62003
KEGG	C05844
PubChem CID	68759
UNII	B5T2Z06Y9N
CompTox Dashboard (EPA)	DTXSID20205030
- InChI: InChI=1S/C7H14N2O6S/c8-5(7(11)12)1-2-6(10)9-3-4-16(13,14)15/h5H,1-4,8H2,(H,9,10)(H,11,12)(H,13,14,15)/t5-/m0/s1 Key: WGXUDTHMEITUBO-YFKPBYRVSA-N; InChI=1/C7H14N2O6S/c8-5(7(11)12)1-2-6(10)9-3-4-16(13,14)15/h5H,1-4,8H2,(H,9,10)(H,11,12)(H,13,14,15)/t5-/m0/s1 Key: WGXUDTHMEITUBO-YFKPBYRVBF
- SMILES: O=C(NCCS(=O)(=O)O)CC[C@@H](C(=O)O)N

Properties
Chemical formula	C_{7}H_{14}N_{2}O_{6}S
Molar mass	254.26
- Except where otherwise noted, data are given for materials in their standard state (at 25 °C [77 °F], 100 kPa). Infobox references

Glutaurine is an endogenous dipeptide which is an amide formed from glutamic acid and taurine.

== Biological role ==
Glutaurine is an antiepileptic with antiamnesia properties. Glutaurine was discovered in the parathyroid in 1980, and later in the mammalian brain. This led to studies on intrinsic and synthetic taurine peptides, and the suggestion that γ-glutamyltransferase (GGT; γ-glutamyl-transpeptidase) in the brain is responsible for its in vivo formation.

The versatile molecule mimics the anxiolytic drug diazepam, and is implicated in phenomena from feline aggression to amphibian metamorphosis, radiation protection, and the glutamatergic system in schizophrenic disorders.
