= Parapropamol =

Names
- IUPAC name N-(4-Hydroxyphenyl)propanamide
- Other names: Acetaminophen impurity B; para-hydroxypropionanilide

Identifiers
CAS Number	1693-37-4
ChemSpider	66922
ECHA InfoCard	100.015.359
PubChem CID	74325
UNII	I729P6N0P7
CompTox Dashboard (EPA)	DTXSID7046419

Properties
Chemical formula	C_{9}H_{11}NO_{2}
Molar mass	165.192 g·mol^{−1}
Appearance	Pale purple solid
Melting point	170–172 °C (338–342 °F; 443–445 K)
Boiling point	389.9 °C (733.8 °F; 663.0 K)
- Except where otherwise noted, data are given for materials in their standard state (at 25 °C [77 °F], 100 kPa). Infobox references

Parapropamol is a non-narcotic analgesic and impurity found in samples of the related and widely used analgesic paracetamol (acetaminophen).

== Appearance ==
Parapropamol is a pale purple solid at room temperature.

== Structure ==
Parapropamol is a small molecule drug. Parapropamol is a structural analogue of paracetamol, containing an extra carbon in its chain. In the solid state, the compound assembles into multiple entangled 3-dimensional, hydrogen-bonded networks, like intertwined nets, called a 3D-interpenetrated supramolecular network. These networks have been reported for inorganic compounds such as SrAl_{2} and CeCu_{2}, but parapropamol may be the first reported instance of an organic compound to exhibit this structure.
