= Formetanate =

Names
- IUPAC name 3-{(E)-[(Dimethylamino)methylene]amino}phenyl methylcarbamate
- Other names Carzol

Identifiers
CAS Number	22259-30-9; 23422-53-9 (HCl)
3D model (JSmol)	Interactive image
ChemSpider	28856
ECHA InfoCard	100.040.784
PubChem CID	31099
UNII	532HEC1KKM; W0Y3OP0N2Z (HCl)
CompTox Dashboard (EPA)	DTXSID9041990
- InChI: InChI=1S/C11H15N3O2/c1-12-11(15)16-10-6-4-5-9(7-10)13-8-14(2)3/h4-8H,1-3H3,(H,12,15)/b13-8+ Key: RMFNNCGOSPBBAD-MDWZMJQESA-N; InChI=1/C11H15N3O2/c1-12-11(15)16-10-6-4-5-9(7-10)13-8-14(2)3/h4-8H,1-3H3,(H,12,15)/b13-8+ Key: RMFNNCGOSPBBAD-MDWZMJQEBJ
- SMILES: O=C(Oc1cccc(\N=C\N(C)C)c1)NC

Properties
Chemical formula	C_{11}H_{15}N_{3}O_{2}
Molar mass	221.260 g·mol^{−1}
Melting point	102 °C
- Except where otherwise noted, data are given for materials in their standard state (at 25 °C [77 °F], 100 kPa). Infobox references

Formetanate is an insecticide and acaricide. It is used on alfalfa grown for seed and on some fruits, including citrus, pome, and stone fruits.

== See also ==
- Formparanate
