= NONOate =

Class of chemical compounds

Diethylamine dinitric oxide, a typical NONOate

In chemistry, a NONOate, also called a diazeniumdiolate, is a compound having the chemical formula R^{1}R^{2}N−(NO^{−})−N=O, where R^{1} and R^{2} are alkyl groups. These compounds are unusual in having three sequential nitrogen atoms: an amine functional group, a bridging NO^{−} group, and a terminal nitrosyl group. Almost all known examples form with the oxygen atoms cis to the double bond, which is also the more thermodynamically stable configuration.

NONOates form reversibly when a pure secondary amine is exposed to nitric oxide:$\ce{2R2NH + 2NO <=> [R2NH2]+[R2N(NO)2]-}$

In contact with water, these compounds release NO (nitric oxide).

== pH-dependent decomposition of NONOates ==
Most NONOates are stable in alkaline solution above pH 8.0 (e. g. 10 mM NaOH) and can be stored at −20 °C in this way for the short term. To generate NO from NONOates, the pH is lowered accordingly. Typically, a dilution of the stock NONOate solution is made in a phosphate buffer (pH 7.4; tris buffers can also be used) and incubated at room temperature for the desired time to allow NO to accumulate in solution. This is often visible as bubbles at high NONOate concentrations. Incubation time is important, since the different NONOates have different half-lives (t_{1/2}) in phosphate buffer at pH 7.4. For example, the half-life of MAHMA NONOate under these conditions is ~3.5 minutes, whilst the t_{1/2} of DPTA NONOate is 300 minutes. This is often useful in biological systems, where a combination of different NONOates can be used to give a sustained release of nitric oxide. At pH 5.0, most NONOates are considered to decompose almost instantaneously.
