= Stand development =

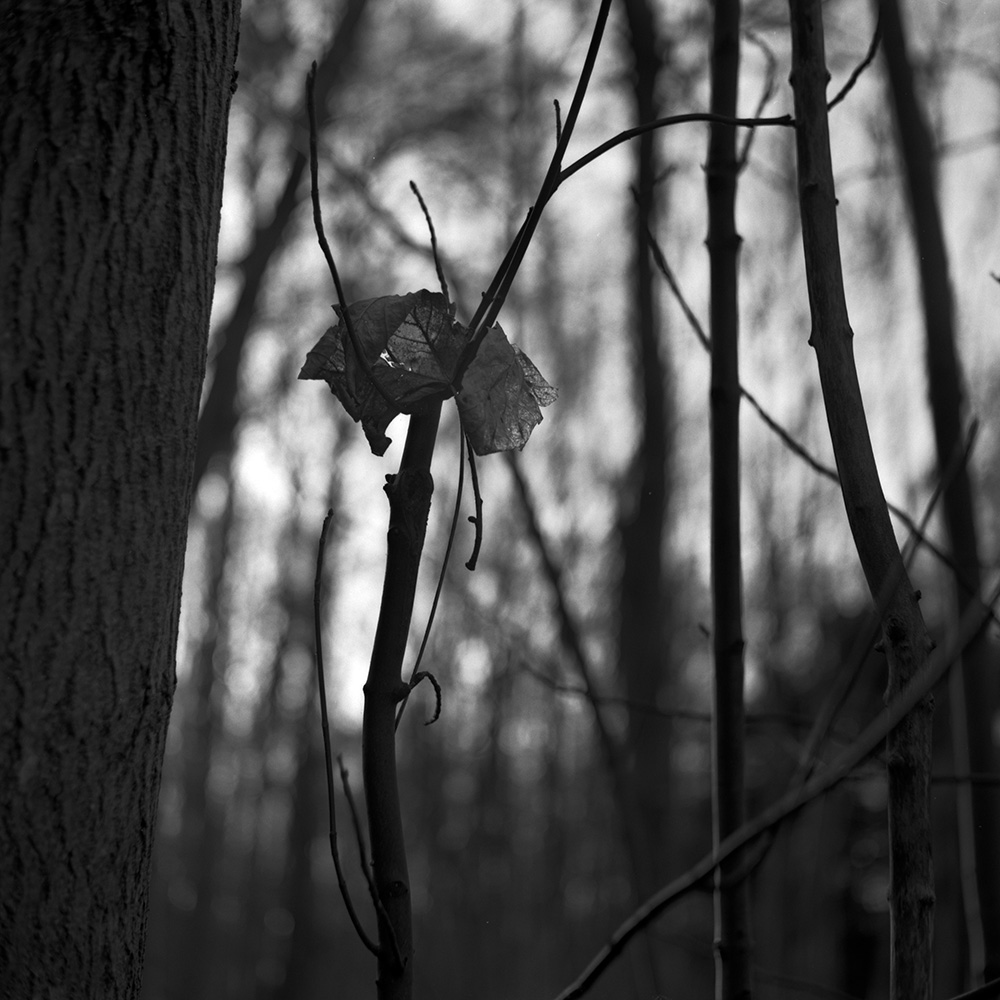
Stand develops shadows while preserving highlights

Stand development is a photographic development process where film is left in a very dilute developing solution for an extended period of time, with little or no agitation. The technique dates back to at least the 1880s, and results in fine grain, increased perceived sharpness, and smooth tonality, but is time-intensive and runs the risk of producing certain processing defects.

== Process ==
In traditional film development, film is processed in concentrated development fluid for a brief period, typically 8 to 12 minutes. During this period the developing fluid is agitated, often by inverting the development tank several times every few minutes. This has the effect of spreading the developing fluid evenly over the surface of the film and preventing localised overdevelopment. Stand development instead uses a very dilute solution of developer, often one part developer to fifty or one hundred parts water. There is almost no agitation beyond initial mixing, and developing times are greatly increased, often an hour or more. A related technique is semi-stand development, which uses a small amount of agitation.

== Advantages ==
Stand development is noted for its perceived sharpness and relative simplicity. The process was popular in the late 19th and early 20th centuries, and was used by Eugene Atget and William Mortensen, among others. It has a compensating effect in that the developer exhausts itself in areas which require greater development while remaining active in less-exposed areas, which has the effect of boosting shadow detail while preserving bright highlights. Stand development is also largely insensitive to variations in exposure, and allows for the development of films rated at different speeds in the same batch.

== Disadvantages ==
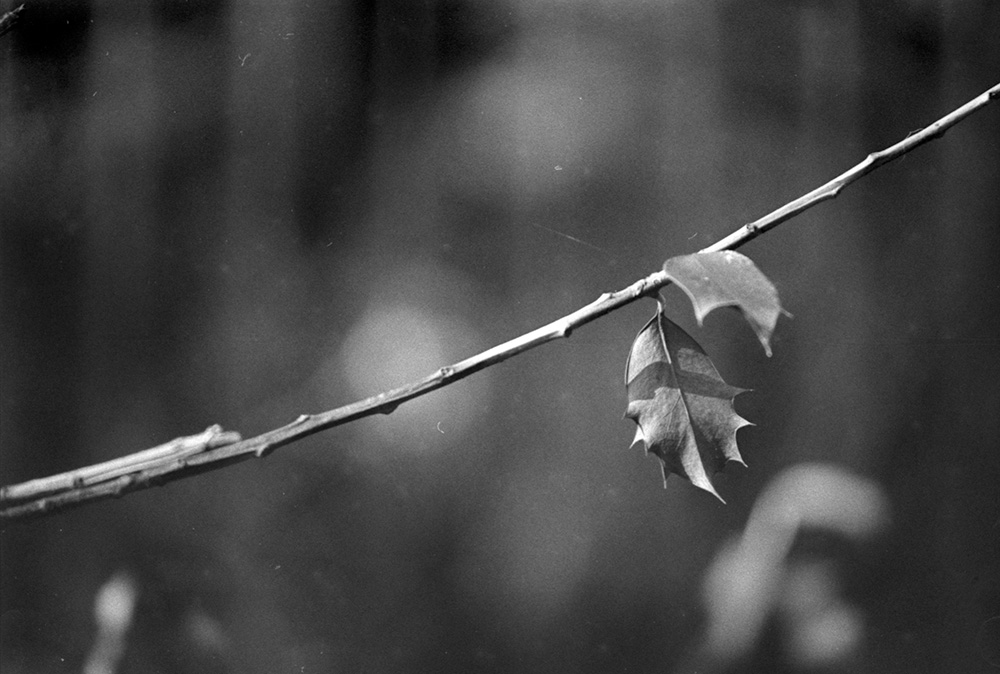
Insufficient agitation can cause streaks on the negative, where developing fluid has settled through the sprocket holes

Without agitation stand development can suffer from bromide drag. The developing process produces bromide ions, which settle towards the bottom of the developing tank. In doing so they create streaks of uneven development on the surface of the film. In the example to the right the developing fluid has filtered through the sprocket holes of a frame of 35mm film, producing streaks of overdevelopment that would have been masked with more agitation.
