= Formparanate =

Names
- IUPAC name 4-{[(Dimethylamino)methylene]amino}-3-methylphenyl methylcarbamate

Identifiers
CAS Number	17702-57-7
3D model (JSmol)	Interactive image
ChemSpider	16738632
PubChem CID	28699
UNII	76S03Y009F
UN number	2992
CompTox Dashboard (EPA)	DTXSID9041992
- InChI: InChI=1S/C12H17N3O2/c1-9-7-10(17-12(16)13-2)5-6-11(9)14-8-15(3)4/h5-8H,1-4H3,(H,13,16) Key: NPCUJHYOBSHUJJ-UHFFFAOYSA-N; InChI=1/C12H17N3O2/c1-9-7-10(17-12(16)13-2)5-6-11(9)14-8-15(3)4/h5-8H,1-4H3,(H,13,16) Key: NPCUJHYOBSHUJJ-UHFFFAOYAT
- SMILES: O=C(Oc1cc(C)c(cc1)/N=C/N(C)C)NC

Properties
Chemical formula	C_{12}H_{17}N_{3}O_{2}
Molar mass	235.287 g·mol^{−1}
- Except where otherwise noted, data are given for materials in their standard state (at 25 °C [77 °F], 100 kPa). Infobox references

Formparanate (chemical formula: C_{12}H_{17}N_{3}O_{2}) is a chemical compound used in acaricides and insecticides.

== Uses ==
Formparanate is a carbamate pesticide that has been used as both an insecticide and an acaricide. It was developed for the control of agricultural pests, particularly mites and certain insect species affecting crops.

== Mechanism of action ==
Like other carbamate pesticides, formparanate acts through inhibition of acetylcholinesterase, an enzyme required for normal nervous system function. Inhibition of this enzyme causes accumulation of acetylcholine at nerve synapses, resulting in overstimulation of the nervous system in susceptible organisms.

== Toxicity ==
Formparanate is considered a highly toxic carbamate pesticide. Toxicological studies have reported significant acute toxicity and cholinesterase-inhibiting activity, characteristics common to many carbamate insecticides and acaricides.

== History and regulatory status ==
Formparanate was developed as a carbamate insecticide and acaricide for the control of agricultural pests. By the early 1970s, it was being studied alongside the related pesticide formetanate, with research examining its toxicity and effectiveness against spider mites and other arthropod pests.

Formparanate subsequently fell out of widespread agricultural use. Modern pesticide references describe it as an obsolete carbamate pesticide, and it is not currently registered for pesticide use in the United States or the European Union.

== See also ==
- Formetanate
