= Mepronil =

Names
- IUPAC name 2-methyl-N-(3-propan-2-yloxyphenyl)benzamide
- Other names KCO-1

Identifiers
| CAS Number | 55814-41-0 |
| 3D model (JSmol) | Interactive image |
| ChEBI | CHEBI:81823 |
| ChEMBL | ChEMBL1615095 |
| ChemSpider | 37994 |
| ECHA InfoCard | 100.120.633 |
| EC Number | 611-317-4 |
| PubChem CID | 41632 |
| UNII | QJK1MXY8DW |
| CompTox Dashboard (EPA) | DTXSID1037565 |
- InChI: InChI=1S/C17H19NO2/c1-12(2)20-15-9-6-8-14(11-15)18-17(19)16-10-5-4-7-13(16)3/h4-12H,1-3H3,(H,18,19) Key: BCTQJXQXJVLSIG-UHFFFAOYSA-N
- SMILES: CC1=CC=CC=C1C(=O)NC2=CC(=CC=C2)OC(C)C

Properties
| Chemical formula | C_{17}H_{19}NO_{2} |
| Molar mass | 269.344 g·mol^{−1} |
| Appearance | Off-white powder |
| Density | 1.11 g/cm^{3} |
| Melting point | 91.4 °C (196.5 °F; 364.5 K) |
| Solubility in water | Slightly soluble (12.1 mg/L, 20 °C) |
| log P | 3.66 |
- Except where otherwise noted, data are given for materials in their standard state (at 25 °C [77 °F], 100 kPa). Infobox references

Mepronil is a fungicide used as a seed treatment or foliar spray in agriculture to protect crops from fungal diseases. It was first marketed by Kumiai Chemical Industries in 1981 using their brand name Basitac. The compound is a benzanilide which combines 2-methylbenzoic acid with the O-isopropyl derivative of 3-aminophenol to give an inhibitor of succinate dehydrogenase (SDHI).

== History ==
Inhibition of succinate dehydrogenase, the complex II in the mitochondrial respiration chain, has been known as a fungicidal mechanism of action since the first examples were marketed in the 1960s. The first compound in this class was carboxin, which had a narrow spectrum of useful biological activity, mainly on basidiomycetes and was used as a seed treatment. Many further examples of this mechanism of action were developed by crop protection companies seeking compounds with improved properties and mepronil was developed owing to its effectiveness as a foliar application and by seed treatment.

== Synthesis ==
Mepronil can be made via the Schotten–Baumann reaction of 2-methylbenzoyl chloride with 3-isopropoxyaniline.

== Mechanism of action ==
SDHI of this type act by binding at the quinone reduction site of the enzyme complex, preventing ubiquinone from doing so. As a consequence, the tricarboxylic acid cycle and electron transport chain cannot function.

== Usage ==
Mepronil has been used since 1981 as a seed treatment to control Rhizoctonia solani on vegetables. It is also used by foliar application to control R. solani on rice, Gymnosporangium fuscum (rust) on pears and Puccinia chrysanthemi on chrysanthemums. As of 2024 it is no longer registered for use, having been superseded by alternative SDHI products.

== Resistance management ==
Fungal populations have the ability to develop resistance to SDHI inhibitors. This potential can be mitigated by careful management. Reports of individual pest species becoming resistant are monitored by manufacturers, regulatory bodies such as the EPA and the Fungicides Resistance Action Committee (FRAC). The risks of resistance developing can be reduced by using a mixture of two or more fungicides which each have activity on relevant pests but with unrelated mechanisms of action. FRAC assigns fungicides into classes so as to facilitate this.

== Brands ==
Mepronil is the ISO common name for the active ingredient which is formulated into the branded product sold to end-users. Basitac was the brand name used for Kumiai's products.
