= Fenretinide =

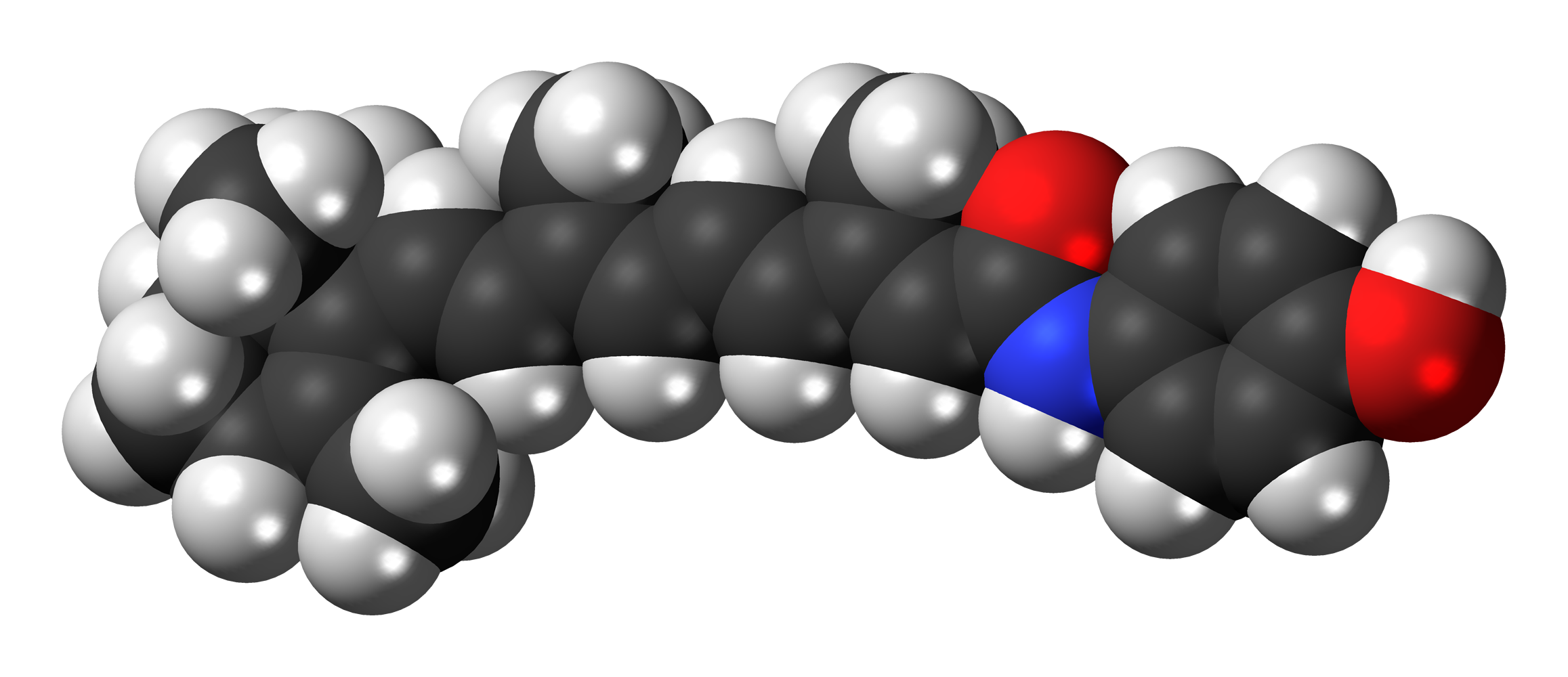

Names
- IUPAC name N-(4-Hydroxyphenyl)retinamide
- Systematic IUPAC name (2E,4E,6E,8E)-N-(4-Hydroxyphenyl)-3,7-dimethyl-9-(2,6,6-trimethylcyclohex-1-en-1-yl)nona-2,4,6,8-tetraenamide

Identifiers
CAS Number	65646-68-6
3D model (JSmol)	Interactive image
ChEMBL	ChEMBL7301
ChemSpider	4450416
DrugBank	DB05076
ECHA InfoCard	100.164.069
KEGG	D04162
MeSH	Fenretinide
PubChem CID	5288209
UNII	187EJ7QEXL
CompTox Dashboard (EPA)	DTXSID2032005
- InChI: InChI=1S/C26H33NO2/c1-19(11-16-24-21(3)10-7-17-26(24,4)5)8-6-9-20(2)18-25(29)27-22-12-14-23(28)15-13-22/h6,8-9,11-16,18,28H,7,10,17H2,1-5H3,(H,27,29)/b9-6+,16-11+,19-8+,20-18+ Key: AKJHMTWEGVYYSE-FXILSDISSA-N; InChI=1/C26H33NO2/c1-19(11-16-24-21(3)10-7-17-26(24,4)5)8-6-9-20(2)18-25(29)27-22-12-14-23(28)15-13-22/h6,8-9,11-16,18,28H,7,10,17H2,1-5H3,(H,27,29)/b9-6+,16-11+,19-8+,20-18+ Key: AKJHMTWEGVYYSE-FXILSDISBU
- SMILES: O=C(Nc1ccc(O)cc1)\C=C(\C=C\C=C(\C=C\C2=C(\CCCC2(C)C)C)C)C

Properties
Chemical formula	C_{26}H_{33}NO_{2}
Molar mass	391.546 g/mol
- Except where otherwise noted, data are given for materials in their standard state (at 25 °C [77 °F], 100 kPa). verify (what is ?) Infobox references

Fenretinide (INN; also known as N-(4-hydroxyphenyl)retinamide and 4-HPR) is a synthetic retinoid derivative. Retinoids are substances related to vitamin A. It has been investigated for potential use in the treatment of cancer, as well as in the treatment of cystic fibrosis, rheumatoid arthritis, acne, psoriasis, and has been found to also slow the production and accumulation of a toxin that leads to vision loss in Stargardt's patients.

In cancer studies, Fenretinide treatment may cause ceramide (a wax-like substance) to build up in tumor cells and is associated with the accumulation of reactive oxygen species (ROS), resulting in cell death through apoptosis and/or necrosis. Fenretinide accumulates preferentially in fatty tissue such as the breast, which may contribute to the effectiveness of fenretinide against breast cancer. Phase III clinical trial data has suggested that fenretinide reduces breast cancer relapse in pre-menopausal women. Common side effects associated with fenretinide treatment include skin dryness and night-blindness, which is reversible upon cessation of treatment. Specific types of cancer under investigation include or have included ovarian, prostate, cervical, lung, renal, bladder, breast, glioma, skin, head and neck carcinoma, non-Hodgkin's lymphoma, neuroblastoma, and Ewing's sarcoma.
