= Para-Nitrophenylphosphate =

para-Nitrophenylphosphate
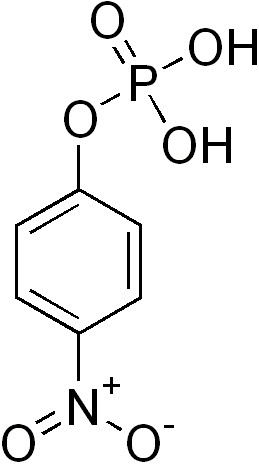

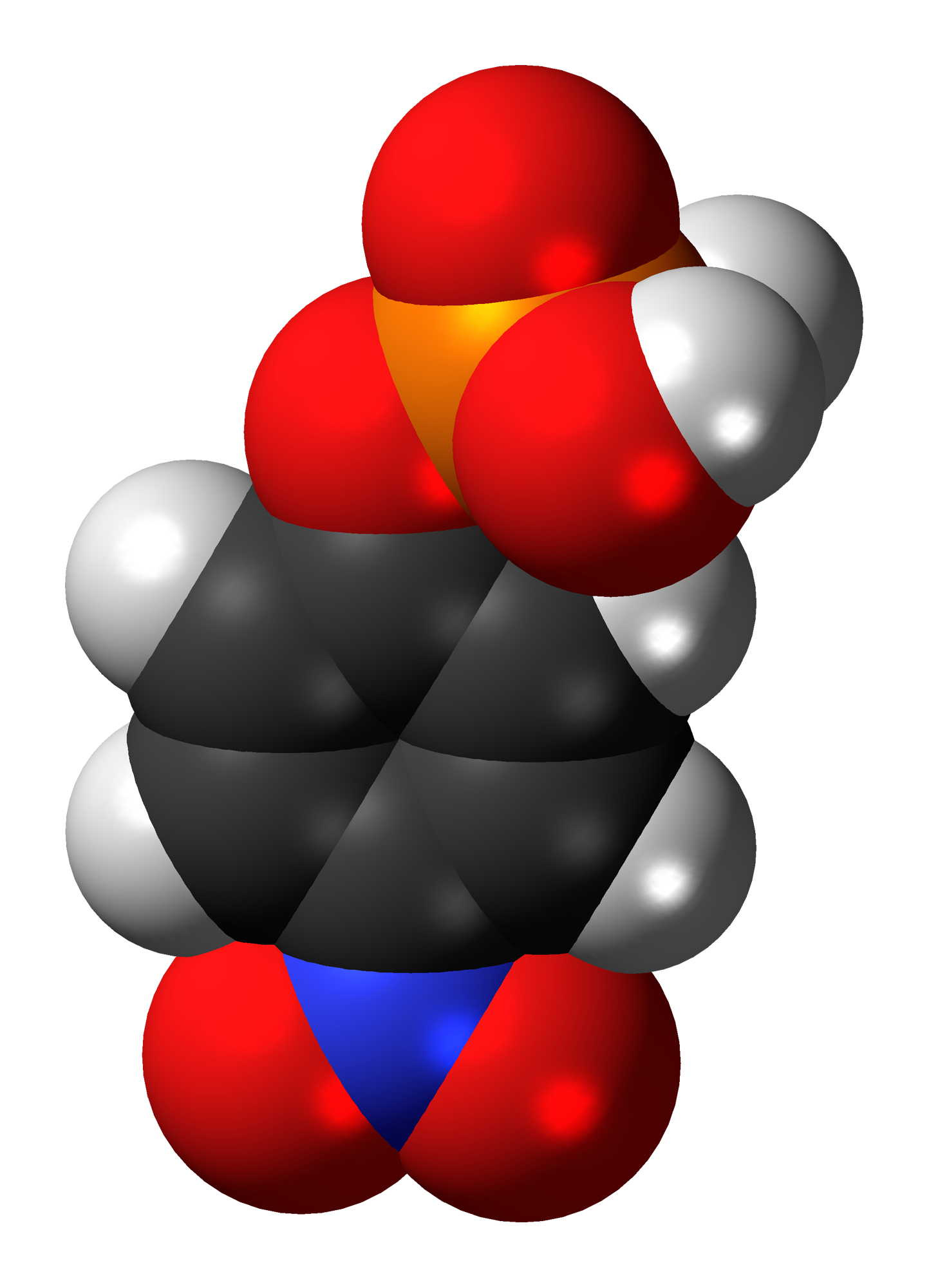

Names
- Preferred IUPAC name 4-Nitrophenyl dihydrogen phosphate
- Other names pNPP

Identifiers
| CAS Number | 330-13-2 |
| 3D model (JSmol) | Interactive image |
| ChEBI | CHEBI:17440 |
| ChEMBL | ChEMBL24231 |
| ChemSpider | 369 |
| ECHA InfoCard | 100.005.777 |
| PubChem CID | 378 |
| UNII | 59NF9TE3BA |
| CompTox Dashboard (EPA) | DTXSID60861876 |
- InChI: InChI=1S/C6H6NO6P/c8-7(9)5-1-3-6(4-2-5)13-14(10,11)12/h1-4H,(H2,10,11,12) Key: XZKIHKMTEMTJQX-UHFFFAOYSA-N; InChI=1/C6H6NO6P/c8-7(9)5-1-3-6(4-2-5)13-14(10,11)12/h1-4H,(H2,10,11,12) Key: XZKIHKMTEMTJQX-UHFFFAOYAU
- SMILES: C1=CC(=CC=C1[N+](=O)[O-])OP(=O)(O)O

Properties
| Chemical formula | C_{6}H_{6}NO_{6}P |
| Molar mass | 219.09 |

Related compounds
| Related compounds | Paraoxon |
- Except where otherwise noted, data are given for materials in their standard state (at 25 °C [77 °F], 100 kPa). verify (what is ?) Infobox references

para-Nitrophenylphosphate (pNPP) is a non-proteinaceous chromogenic substrate for alkaline and acid phosphatases used in ELISA and conventional spectrophotometric assays. Phosphatases catalyze the hydrolysis of pNPP liberating inorganic phosphate and the conjugate base of para-nitrophenol (pNP). The resulting phenolate is yellow, with a maximal absorption at 405 nm. This property can be used to determine the activity of various phosphatases including alkaline phosphatase (AP) and protein tyrosine phosphatase (PTP).

PNPP is classified as a chromogenic substrate because of its ability to transform from a colorless compound to a colored compound through a biological mechanism, dephosphorylation. pNPP is used because of its low cost and the rate of the reactions can be measured over a wide range of substrate concentrations because the concentration of the substrate is not a limiting factor in the reaction. The limitations of pNPP is that it is a small molecule and perhaps does not entirely represent the conditions and structures that are encountered physiologically.

A pNPP assay involves mixing the sample with a pNPP-containing mixture and permitting the reaction to run its course for a predetermined period of time. After that point, the process is halted through the addition of a stop solution, often made of a potent alkali like sodium hydroxide.

The substance is sensitive to light, and thus should be stored protected from light. This is also important after adding the substrate to the mixture and before reading. −20 °C is the optimal storage temperature.

To get precise and credible findings, the assay parameters must be carefully regulated because the reaction is sensitive to factors such as pH, temperature, and the varying degree of inhibitors or stimulants.
