= N-Phenylhydroxylamine =

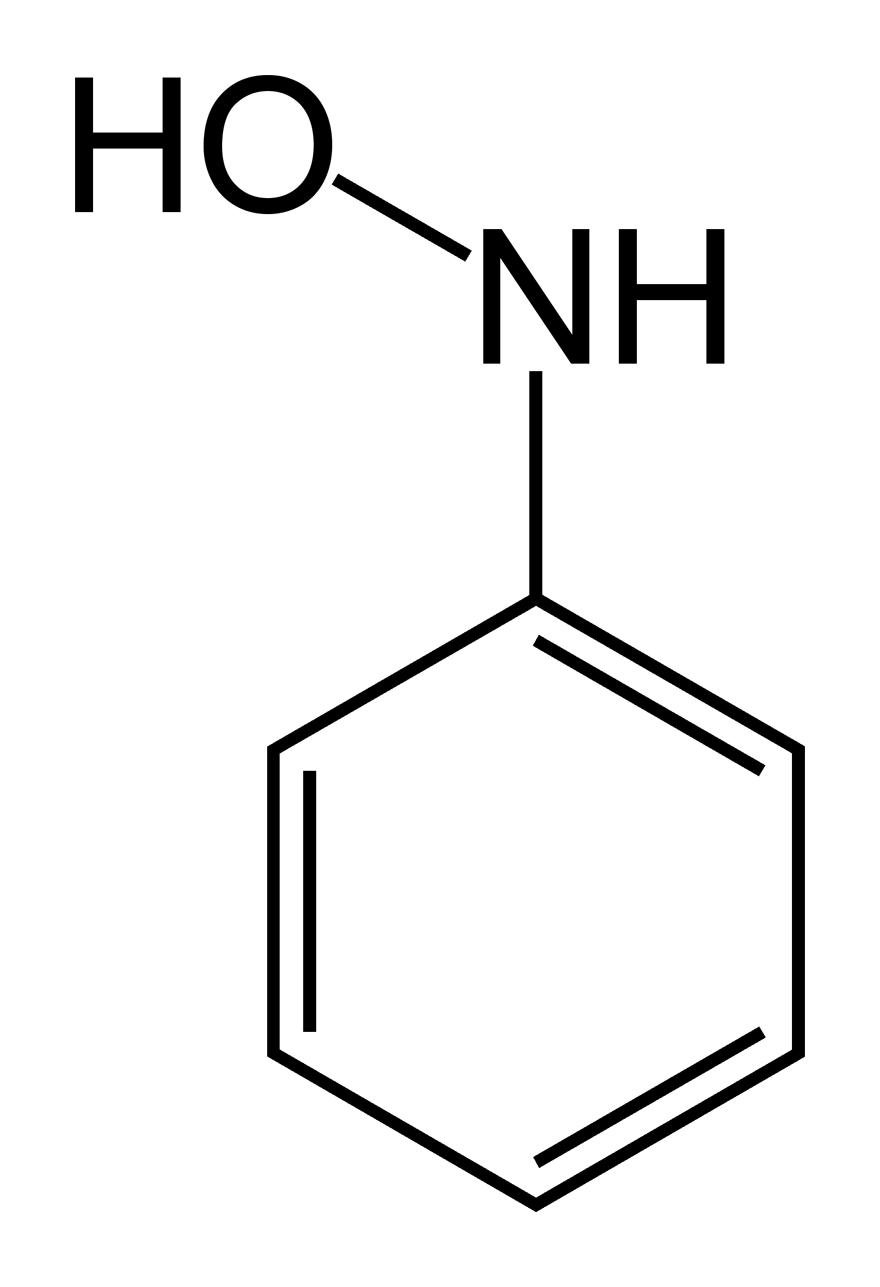

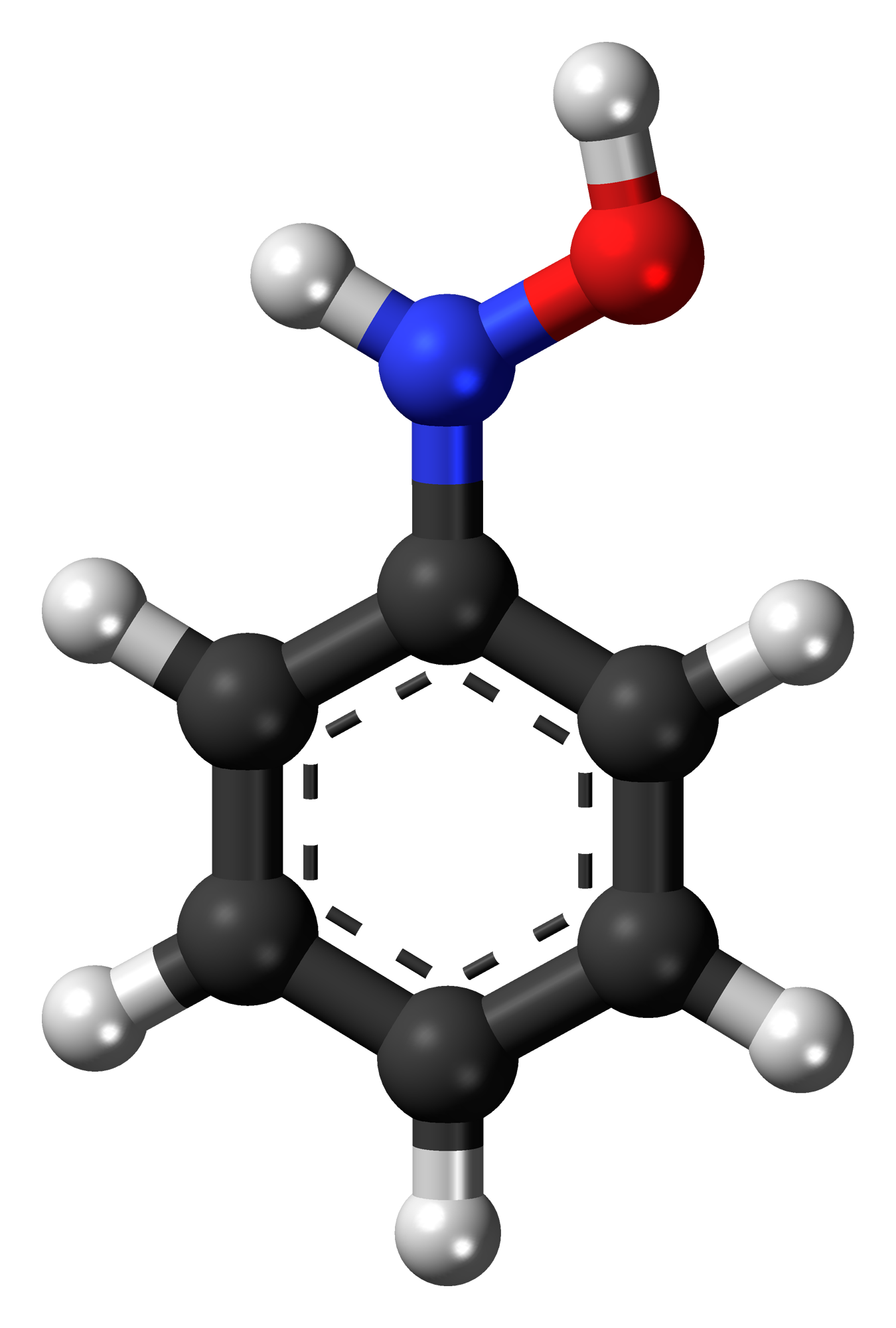

Names
- Preferred IUPAC name N-Hydroxyaniline
- Other names beta-phenylhydroxylamine; phenylhydroxylamine; N-hydroxybenzeneamine; hydroxylaminobenzene

Identifiers
CAS Number	100-65-2
3D model (JSmol)	Interactive image
ChEBI	CHEBI:28902
ChemSpider	7237
ECHA InfoCard	100.002.614
EC Number	209-711-2
KEGG	C02720
PubChem CID	7518
UNII	282MU82Z9A
CompTox Dashboard (EPA)	DTXSID3025889
- InChI: InChI=1S/C6H7NO/c8-7-6-4-2-1-3-5-6/h1-5,7-8H Key: CKRZKMFTZCFYGB-UHFFFAOYSA-N; InChI=1/C6H7NO/c8-7-6-4-2-1-3-5-6/h1-5,7-8H Key: CKRZKMFTZCFYGB-UHFFFAOYAK
- SMILES: ONC1=CC=CC=C1

Properties
Chemical formula	C_{6}H_{7}NO
Molar mass	109.1274 g/mol
Appearance	yellow needles
Melting point	80 to 81 °C (176 to 178 °F; 353 to 354 K)
Magnetic susceptibility (χ)	−68.2·10^{−6} cm^{3}/mol

Related compounds
Related compounds	hydroxylamine, nitrosobenzene
- Except where otherwise noted, data are given for materials in their standard state (at 25 °C [77 °F], 100 kPa). verify (what is ?) Infobox references

N-Phenylhydroxylamine is the organic compound with the formula C_{6}H_{5}NHOH. It is an intermediate in the redox-related pair C_{6}H_{5}NH_{2} and C_{6}H_{5}NO. N-Phenylhydroxylamine should not be confused with its isomer α-phenylhydroxylamine or O-phenylhydroxylamine.

== Preparation ==
This compound can be prepared by the reduction of nitrobenzene with zinc in the presence of NH_{4}Cl.

Alternatively, it can be prepared by transfer hydrogenation of nitrobenzene using hydrazine as an H_{2} source over a rhodium catalyst.

== Reactions ==
Cupferron (N-nitroso-N-phenylhydroxylamine), a reagent for qualitative inorganic analysis, is prepared from phenylhydroxylamine.

Phenylhydroxylamine is unstable to heating, and in the presence of strong acids easily rearranges to 4-aminophenol via the Bamberger rearrangement. Oxidation of phenylhydroxylamine with dichromate gives nitrosobenzene.

Like other hydroxylamines it will react with aldehydes to form nitrones, illustrative is the condensation with benzaldehyde to form diphenylnitrone, a well-known 1,3-dipolar compound:

C_{6}H_{5}NHOH + C_{6}H_{5}CHO → C_{6}H_{5}N(O)=CHC_{6}H_{5} + H_{2}O

Phenylhydroxylamine is attacked by NO^{+} sources to give cupferron:

C_{6}H_{5}NHOH + C_{4}H_{9}ONO + NH_{3} → NH_{4}[C_{6}H_{5}N(O)NO] + C_{4}H_{9}OH
