= Karbutilate =

Chemical compound

Names
- Preferred IUPAC name [3-(dimethylcarbamoylamino)phenyl] N-tert-butylcarbamate
- Other names: karbutylate; tanzine; CGA 61837 (development code)

Identifiers
CAS Number	4849-32-5
3D model (JSmol)	Interactive image
ChEBI	CHEBI:81743
ChEMBL	ChEMBL2252176
ChemSpider	19744
ECHA InfoCard	100.023.126
EC Number	225-439-7
PubChem CID	312440
UNII	49A0A2590D
CompTox Dashboard (EPA)	DTXSID70925771 DTXSID0042084, DTXSID70925771
- InChI: InChI=1S/C14H21N3O3/c1-14(2,3)16-13(19)20-11-8-6-7-10(9-11)15-12(18)17(4)5/h6-9H,1-5H3,(H,15,18)(H,16,19) Key: UQVYUTAMNICZNI-UHFFFAOYSA-N
- SMILES: CC(C)(C)NC(=O)OC1=CC=CC(=C1)NC(=O)N(C)C

Properties
Chemical formula	C_{14}H_{21}N_{3}O_{3}
Molar mass	279.340 g·mol^{−1}
Solubility in water	94.4 mg/L

Hazards
- GHS labelling
Pictograms	(GHS07: Exclamation mark) (GHS09: Environmental hazard)
Signal word	Warning
Hazard statements	H319, H400
Precautionary statements	P264+P265, P273, P280, P305+P351+P338, P337+P317, P391, P501
- Lethal dose or concentration (LD, LC)
LD_{50} (median dose)	3000 mg/kg (rat, oral)
- Except where otherwise noted, data are given for materials in their standard state (at 25 °C [77 °F], 100 kPa). Infobox references

Karbutilate is a post- and pre-emergent herbicide. It is a carbamate ester and substituted urea, and its formula is C_{14}H_{21}N_{3}O_{3}. After a 4-year development period, it was first sold in 1968, marketed under the name Tandex. It controls annual broadleaf weeds, grasses and vines, and is used in non-crop scenarios like drainage ditches and industrial sites.

== History ==
Karbutilate is a derivative of carbamic acid, and is of the class of carbamate pesticides developed following the introduction of carbaryl in 1956. It was developed by the Niagara Chemical Division of FMC Corporation from 1964 to 1968, and made its debut under the name Tandex. It is currently not classified by or approved for use by the European Union, as its registration has expired and is marked as obsolete, though in 2015 it was reportedly registered in the USA.

== Uses ==
Karbutilate acts as an herbicide on broad-leaf plants by inhibiting photosynthesis.

Karbutilate has been investigated, alongside other carbamate pesticides, as having a potential cleanup route by photodegradation in the case of accidental spill or other unwanted environmental exposure. Irradiation by ultraviolet light has been noted as primarily causing the cleavage of the ester bond in carbamate esters.Pesticide formulations of karbutilate are usually granules (GR) or wettable powders (WP).

== Toxicity ==
Though carbamate pesticides are broadly used due to their low oral and dermal toxicity to mammals, karbutilate poses a potential hazard to humans as a cholinesterase inhibitor. It is also potentially hazardous to Hymenopterans. It is non-toxic to wildlife and fish, though might be a mild skin irritant and/or harmful if ingested, so an ADI is set at 0.005 mg/kg bodyweight per day, equalling 0.4 mg/kg/day for an 80 kg adult.

== Links ==
- Karbutilate in the Pesticide Properties DataBase (PPDB)
