= 4-Aminophenol =

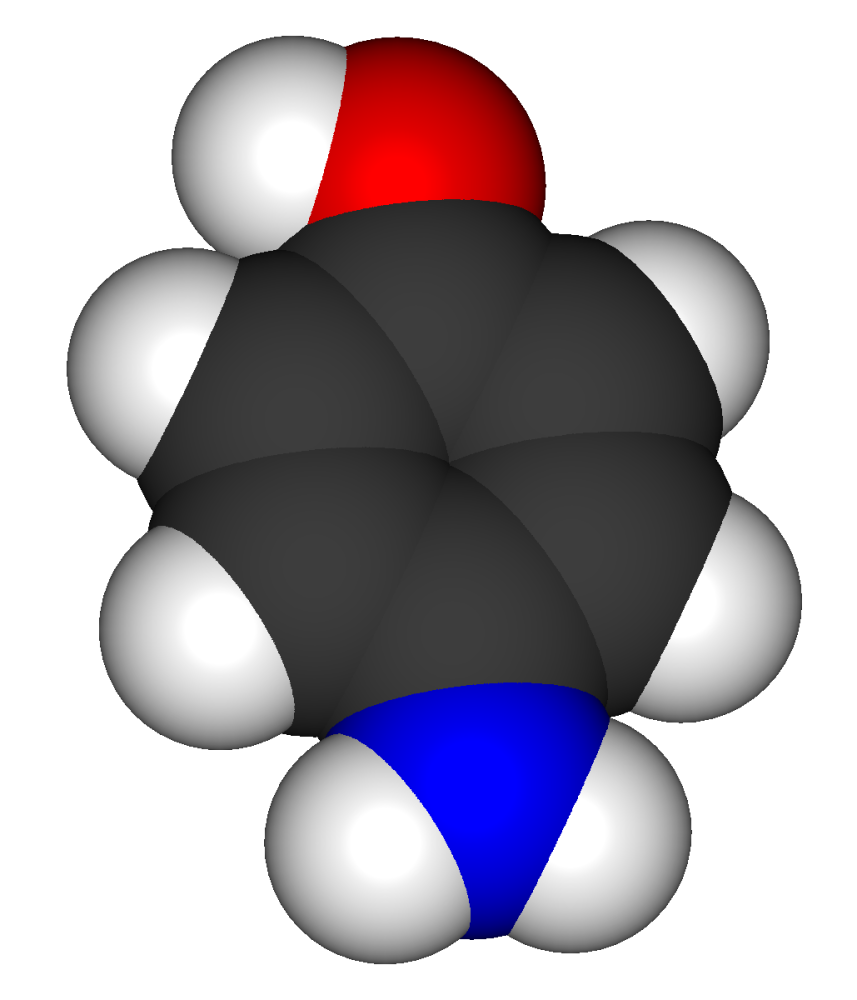

Names
- Preferred IUPAC name 4-Aminophenol
- Other names: p-Aminophenol; para-Aminophenol

Identifiers
| CAS Number | 123-30-8 |
| 3D model (JSmol) | Interactive image; Interactive image |
| Beilstein Reference | 385836 |
| ChEBI | CHEBI:17602 |
| ChEMBL | ChEMBL1142 |
| ChemSpider | 392 |
| ECHA InfoCard | 100.004.198 |
| EC Number | 204-616-2 |
| Gmelin Reference | 2926 |
| KEGG | C02372 |
| MeSH | Aminophenols |
| PubChem CID | 403 |
| UNII | R7P8FRP05V |
| UN number | 2512 |
| CompTox Dashboard (EPA) | DTXSID3024499 |
- InChI: InChI=1S/C6H7NO/c7-5-1-3-6(8)4-2-5/h1-4,8H,7H2 Key: PLIKAWJENQZMHA-UHFFFAOYSA-N; InChI=1/C6H7NO/c7-5-1-3-6(8)4-2-5/h1-4,8H,7H2 Key: PLIKAWJENQZMHA-UHFFFAOYAD
- SMILES: Oc1ccc(N)cc1; c1cc(ccc1N)O

Properties
| Chemical formula | C_{6}H_{7}NO |
| Molar mass | 109.128 g·mol^{−1} |
| Appearance | Colorless to reddish-yellow crystals |
| Density | 1.13 g/cm^{3} |
| Melting point | 187.5 °C (369.5 °F; 460.6 K) |
| Boiling point | 284 °C (543 °F; 557 K) |
| Solubility in water | 1.5 g/100 mL |
| Solubility | Very soluble in dimethylsulfoxide; Soluble in acetonitrile, ethyl acetate, and acetone; Slightly soluble in toluene, diethyl ether, and ethanol; Negligible solubility in benzene and chloroform |
| log P | 0.04 |
| Acidity (pK_{a}) | 5.48 (amino; H_{2}O); 10.30 (phenol; H_{2}O) |

Structure
| Crystal structure | orthorhombic |

Thermochemistry
| Std enthalpy of formation (Δ_{f}H^{⦵}_{298}) | −190.6 kJ/mol |

Hazards
- GHS labelling
| Pictograms | (GHS07: Exclamation mark) (GHS08: Health hazard) (GHS09: Environmental hazard) |
| Signal word | Warning |
| Hazard statements | H302, H332, H341, H410 |
| Precautionary statements | P201, P202, P261, P264, P270, P271, P273, P281, P301+P312, P304+P312, P304+P340, P308+P313, P312, P330, P391, P405, P501 |
| NFPA 704 (fire diamond) | 2 1 0 |
| Flash point | 195 °C (383 °F; 468 K) (cc) |
- Lethal dose or concentration (LD, LC)
| LD_{50} (median dose) | 671 mg/kg |

Related compounds
| Related aminophenols | 2-Aminophenol; 3-Aminophenol |
| Related compounds | Aniline; Phenol |
- Except where otherwise noted, data are given for materials in their standard state (at 25 °C [77 °F], 100 kPa). verify (what is ?) Infobox references

4-Aminophenol (or para-aminophenol or p-aminophenol) is an organic compound with the formula H_{2}NC_{6}H_{4}OH. It is a metabolite of acetaminophen which the body converts to N-arachidonoylphenolamine and this compound is responsible for all or part of acetaminophen's analgesic action and anticonvulsant effects.

Commercially available as a white powder, it is commonly used as a developer for black-and-white film, marketed under the name Rodinal.

Reflecting its slightly hydrophilic character, the white powder is moderately soluble in alcohols and can be recrystallized from hot water. In the presence of a base, it oxidizes readily. The methylated derivatives N-methylaminophenol and N,N-dimethylaminophenol are of commercial value.

The compound is one of three isomeric aminophenols, the other two being 2-aminophenol and 3-aminophenol.

== Preparation ==
4-Aminophenol can be prepared by several routes. One route is hydrogenation of 4-nitrophenol over Raney nickel.

HOC_{6}H_{4}NO_{2} + 3 H_{2} → HOC_{6}H_{4}NH2 + 2 H_{2}O

The nitrophenol can also be reduced by iron or by stannous chloride.

4-Aminophenol can be produced by reduction of nitrobenzene via the intermediate phenylhydroxylamine, which spontaneously rearranges to 4-aminophenol.

C_{6}H_{5}NHOH → HOC_{6}H_{4}NH_{2}

== Uses ==
4-Aminophenol is used in the synthesis of the following compounds: Paracetamol, amodiaquine, mesalazine, AM404, parapropamol, B-86810 & B-87836 (cf. WO 2001042204), fenretinide, Osalmid, 4,4'-Oxydianiline, P-Phenetidine.

4-Aminophenol converts readily to the diazonium salt.
