= 4-Nitrophenol =

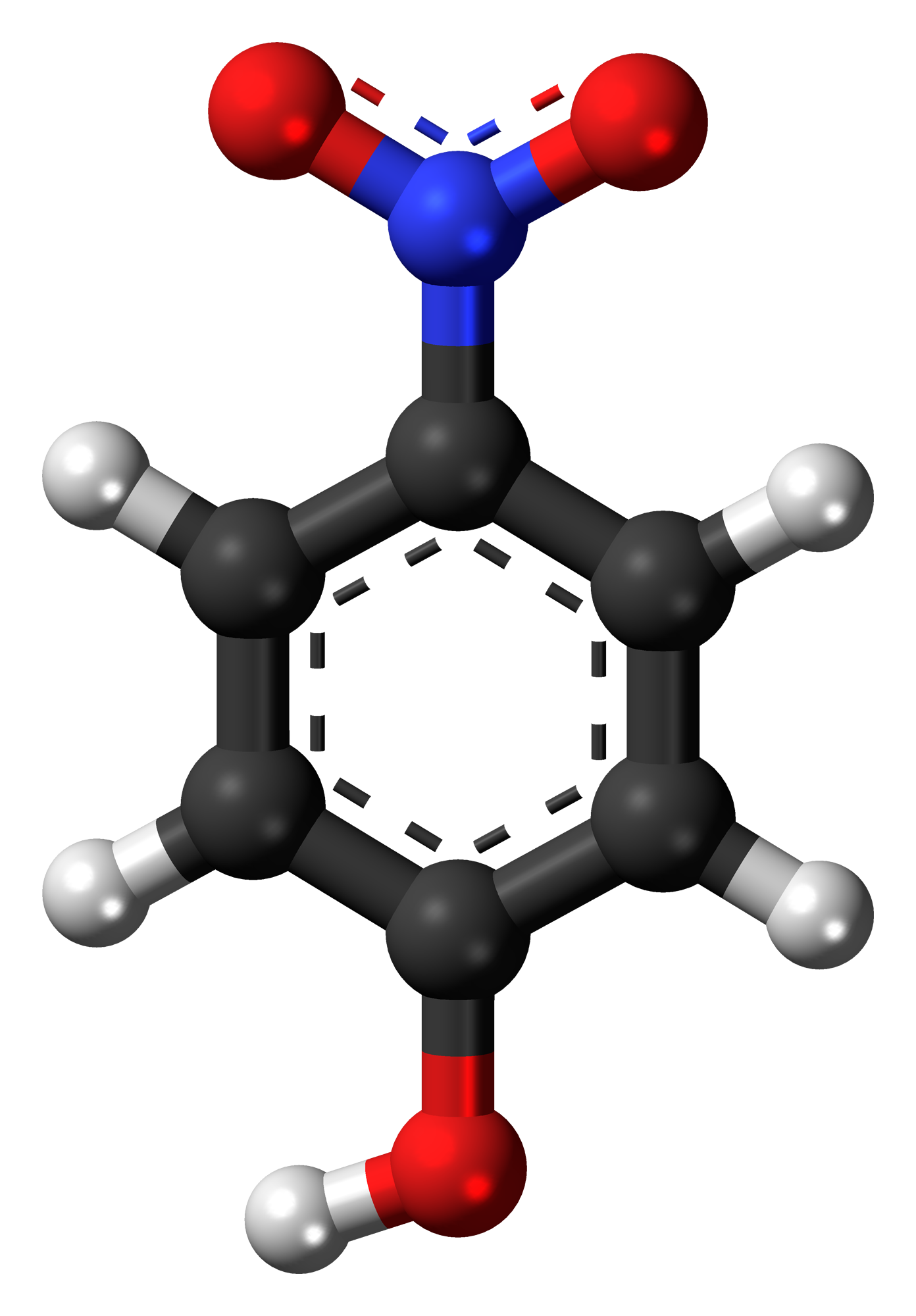

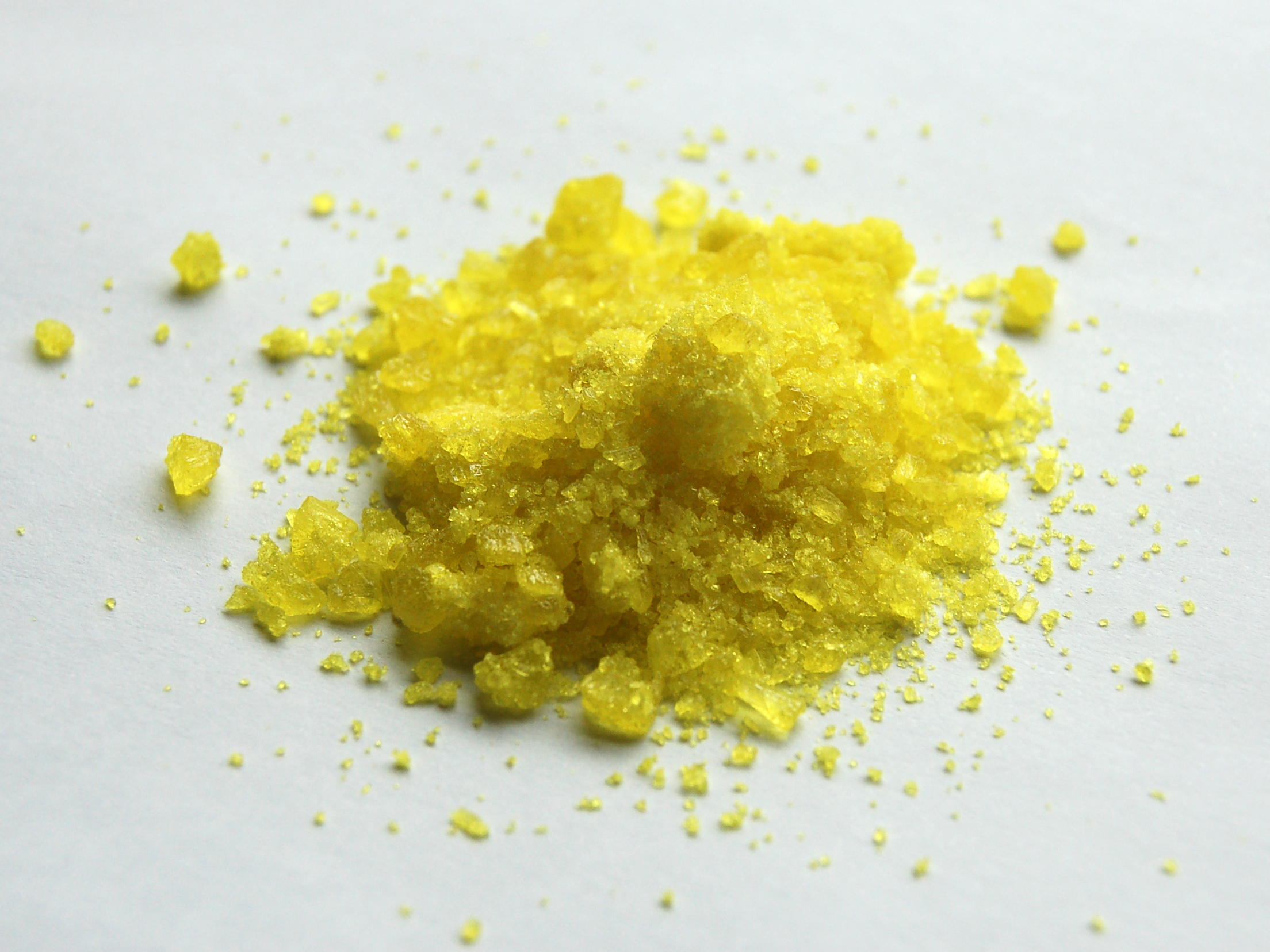

Names
- Preferred IUPAC name 4-Nitrophenol
- Other names: p-Nitrophenol; para-Nitrophenol; 4-Hydroxynitrobenzene; PNP

Identifiers
CAS Number	100-02-7
3D model (JSmol)	Interactive image; Interactive image
ChEBI	CHEBI:16836
ChEMBL	ChEMBL14130
ChemSpider	955
DrugBank	DB04417
ECHA InfoCard	100.002.556
KEGG	C00870
PubChem CID	980
UNII	Y92ZL45L4R
CompTox Dashboard (EPA)	DTXSID0021834
- InChI: InChI=1S/C6H5NO3/c8-6-3-1-5(2-4-6)7(9)10/h1-4,8H Key: BTJIUGUIPKRLHP-UHFFFAOYSA-N; InChI=1/C6H5NO3/c8-6-3-1-5(2-4-6)7(9)10/h1-4,8H Key: BTJIUGUIPKRLHP-UHFFFAOYAP
- SMILES: O=[N+]([O-])c1ccc(O)cc1; c1cc(ccc1[N+](=O)[O-])O

Properties
Chemical formula	C_{6}H_{5}NO_{3}
Molar mass	139.110 g·mol^{−1}
Appearance	Colourless to pale yellow crystals
Density	1.48 g/cm^{3} (20 °C (68 °F; 293 K))
Melting point	110 to 115 °C (230 to 239 °F; 383 to 388 K)
Boiling point	279 °C (534 °F; 552 K)
Solubility in water	10 g/L (15 °C (59 °F; 288 K)); 11.6 g/L (20 °C (68 °F; 293 K)); 16 g/L (25 °C (77 °F; 298 K))
log P	1.95
Vapor pressure	0.6 mmHg (0.080 kPa) (120 °C (248 °F; 393 K))
Acidity (pK_{a})	7.15
Magnetic susceptibility (χ)	−69.5×10^{−6} cm^{3}/mol

Hazards
- GHS labelling
Pictograms	(GHS07: Exclamation mark) (GHS08: Health hazard)
Signal word	Warning
Hazard statements	H302+H312+H332, H373, H402
Precautionary statements	P260, P264, P270, P271, P273, P280, P301+P312+P330, P302+P352+P312, P304+P340+P312, P314, P363, P501
NFPA 704 (fire diamond)	3 1 1
Flash point	169 °C (336 °F; 442 K)
Autoignition temperature	510 °C (950 °F; 783 K)
- Lethal dose or concentration (LD, LC)
LD_{50} (median dose)	202 mg/kg (oral, rat); 1024 mg/kg (dermal, rat)
LC_{50} (median concentration)	4.7 mg/L (inhalation, rat - 4h - dust / mist)
- Except where otherwise noted, data are given for materials in their standard state (at 25 °C [77 °F], 100 kPa). verify (what is ?) Infobox references

4-Nitrophenol (also called p-nitrophenol or 4-hydroxynitrobenzene) is a phenolic compound that has a nitro group at the opposite position of the hydroxyl group on the benzene ring.

== Properties ==
This compound is a yellow crystalline powder with moderate human toxicity.

It shows two polymorphs in the crystalline state. The alpha-form is colorless pillars, unstable at room temperature, and stable toward sunlight. The beta-form is yellow pillars, stable at room temperature, and gradually turns red upon irradiation of sunlight. Usually 4-nitrophenol exists as a mixture of these two forms.

== Preparation ==
=== From phenol ===
4-Nitrophenol can be prepared by nitration of phenol using dilute nitric acid at room temperature. The reaction produces a mixture of 2-nitrophenol and 4-nitrophenol.

Nitration of phenol

== Uses ==
=== pH indicator ===
4-Nitrophenol (pH indicator)
below pH 5.4		above pH 7.5
(colorless) 5.4	⇌	7.5 (yellow)

4-Nitrophenol can be used as a pH indicator. A solution of 4-nitrophenol appears colorless below pH 5.4 and yellow above pH 7.5. This color-changing property makes this compound useful as a pH indicator. The yellow color of the 4-nitrophenolate form (or 4-nitrophenoxide) is due to a maximum of absorbance at 405 nm (ε = 18.3 to 18.4 mM^{-1}·cm^{-1} in strong alkali). In contrast, 4-nitrophenol has a weak absorbance at 405 nm (ε = 0.2 mM^{-1}·cm^{-1}). The isosbestic point for 4-nitrophenol/4-nitrophenoxide is at 348 nm, with (ε = 5.4 mM^{-1}·cm^{-1}).

=== Other uses ===
- 4-Nitrophenol is an intermediate in the synthesis of paracetamol. It is reduced to 4-aminophenol, then acetylated with acetic anhydride.
- 4-Nitrophenol is used as the precursor for the preparation of phenetidine and acetophenetidine, indicators, and raw materials for fungicides. Bioaccumulation of this compound rarely occurs.
- In peptide synthesis, carboxylate ester derivatives of 4-nitrophenol may serve as activated components for construction of amide moieties.
- In drug chemistry (medicine), 4-nitrophenol finds utility in the synthesis of fedratinib & glutaurine (protecting group).

=== Uses of derivatives ===
In the laboratory, it is used to detect the presence of alkaline phosphatase activity by hydrolysis of pNPP. In basic conditions, presence of hydrolytic enzymes will turn reaction vessel yellow.

4-Nitrophenol is a product of the enzymatic cleavage of several synthetic substrates such as 4-nitrophenyl phosphate (used as a substrate for alkaline phosphatase), 4-nitrophenyl acetate (for carbonic anhydrase), 4-nitrophenyl-β-D-glucopyranoside and other sugar derivatives which are used to assay various glycosidase enzymes. Amounts of 4-nitrophenol produced by a particular enzyme in the presence of its corresponding substrate can be measured with a spectrophotometer at or around 405 nm and used as a proxy measurement for the amount of the enzyme activity in the sample.

Accurate measurement of enzyme activity requires that the 4-nitrophenol product is fully deprotonated, existing as 4-nitrophenolate, given the weak absorbance of 4-nitrophenol at 405 nm. Complete ionization of the alcohol functional group affects the conjugation of the pi bonds on the compound. A lone pair from the oxygen can be delocalized via conjugation to the benzene ring and nitro group. Since the length of conjugated systems affects the color of organic compounds, this ionization change causes the 4-nitrophenol to turn yellow when fully deprotonated and existing as 4-nitrophenolate.

A common mistake in measuring enzyme activity using these substrates is to perform the assays at neutral or acidic pH without considering that only part of the chromophoric product is ionized. The problem can be overcome by stopping the reaction with sodium hydroxide (NaOH) or other strong base, which converts all product into 4-nitrophenoxide; final pH must be > ca. 9.2 to ensure more than 99% of the product is ionised. Alternatively enzyme activity can be measured at 348 nm, the isosbestic point for 4-nitrophenol/4-nitrophenoxide.

== Toxicity ==
4-Nitrophenol irritates the eyes, skin, and respiratory tract. It may also cause inflammation of those parts. It has a delayed interaction with blood and forms methaemoglobin which is responsible for methemoglobinemia, potentially causing cyanosis, confusion, and unconsciousness. When ingested, it causes abdominal pain and vomiting. Prolonged contact with skin may cause allergic response. Genotoxicity and carcinogenicity of 4-nitrophenol are not known.

== See also ==
- Nitrophenols
