= Nitrophenol =

Nitrophenols are compounds of the formula HOC_{6}H_{5−x}(NO_{2})_{x}. The conjugate bases are called nitrophenolates. Nitrophenols are more acidic than phenol itself.

== Mono-nitrophenols ==
Mono-nitrophenols
- 2-Nitrophenol (o-)

- 3-Nitrophenol (m-)

- 4-Nitrophenol (p-)

Identifiers
- Compounds; o: o-nitrophenol (2-); m: m-nitrophenol (3-); p: p-nitrophenol (4-); p: p tautomer
CAS Number	o: 88-75-5; m: 554-84-7; p: 100-02-7
3D model (JSmol)	o: Interactive image; m: Interactive image; p: Interactive image; p: Interactive image
ChEBI	o: CHEBI:16260; m: CHEBI:34346; p: CHEBI:16836
ChEMBL	m: ChEMBL13888; p: ChEMBL14130
ChemSpider	p: 955
DrugBank	p: DB04417
KEGG	p: C00870
PubChem CID	o: 6947; m: 11137; p: 980
UNII	o: BD148E95KD; m: T6P4T52V9W; p: Y92ZL45L4R
- InChI: o: InChI=1S/C6H5NO3/c8-6-4-2-1-3-5(6)7(9)10/h1-4,8H Key: IQUPABOKLQSFBK-UHFFFAOYSA-N; m: InChI=1S/C6H5NO3/c8-6-3-1-2-5(4-6)7(9)10/h1-4,8H Key: RTZZCYNQPHTPPL-UHFFFAOYSA-N; p: InChI=1S/C6H5NO3/c8-6-3-1-5(2-4-6)7(9)10/h1-4,8H Key: BTJIUGUIPKRLHP-UHFFFAOYSA-N
- SMILES: o: Oc1ccccc1[N+]([O-])=O; m: Oc1cccc(c1)[N+]([O-])=O; p: c1cc(ccc1[N+](=O)[O-])O; p: O=[N+]([O-])c1ccc(O)cc1

Properties
Chemical formula	C_{6}H_{5}NO_{3}
Molar mass	139.110 g·mol^{−1}
- Except where otherwise noted, data are given for materials in their standard state (at 25 °C [77 °F], 100 kPa). Infobox references

with the formula HOC_{6}H_{4}NO_{2}. Three isomeric nitrophenols exist:

- o-Nitrophenol (2-nitrophenol; OH and NO_{2} groups are neighboring), a yellow solid.
- m-Nitrophenol (3-nitrophenol, CAS number: 554-84-7), a yellow solid (m.p. 97 °C) and precursor to the drug mesalazine (5-aminosalicylic acid). It can be prepared by nitration of aniline followed by replacement of the amino group via its diazonium derivative.
- p-Nitrophenol, yellow solid is a precursor to the rice herbicide fluorodifen, the pesticide parathion, and the human analgesic paracetamol (also known as acetaminophen).

The mononitrated phenols are often hydrogenated to the corresponding aminophenols that are also useful industrially.

== Di- and trinitrophenols ==
- 2,4-Dinitrophenol (m.p. 83 °C) is a moderately strong acid (pK_{a} = 4.89).

2,4-dinitrophenol

- 2,4,6-Trinitrophenol is better known as picric acid, which has a well-developed chemistry.

picric acid

== Safety ==
Nitrophenols are poisonous. Occasionally, nitrophenols contaminate the soil near former explosives or fabric factories and military plants, and current research is aimed at remediation.
