= 2-Aminophenol =

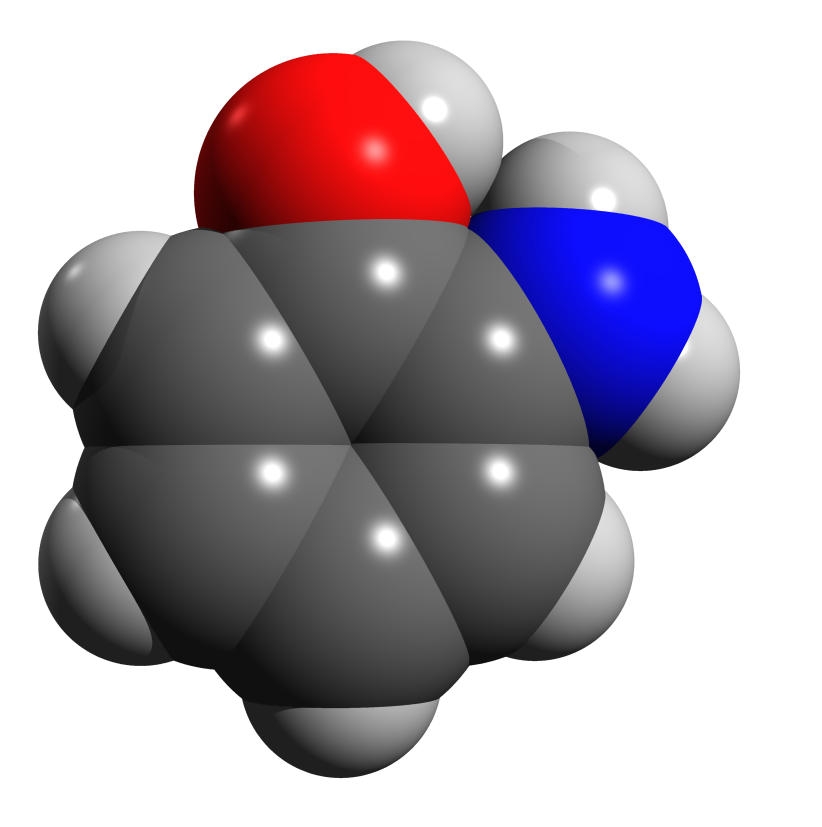
Space filling model of 2-aminophenol
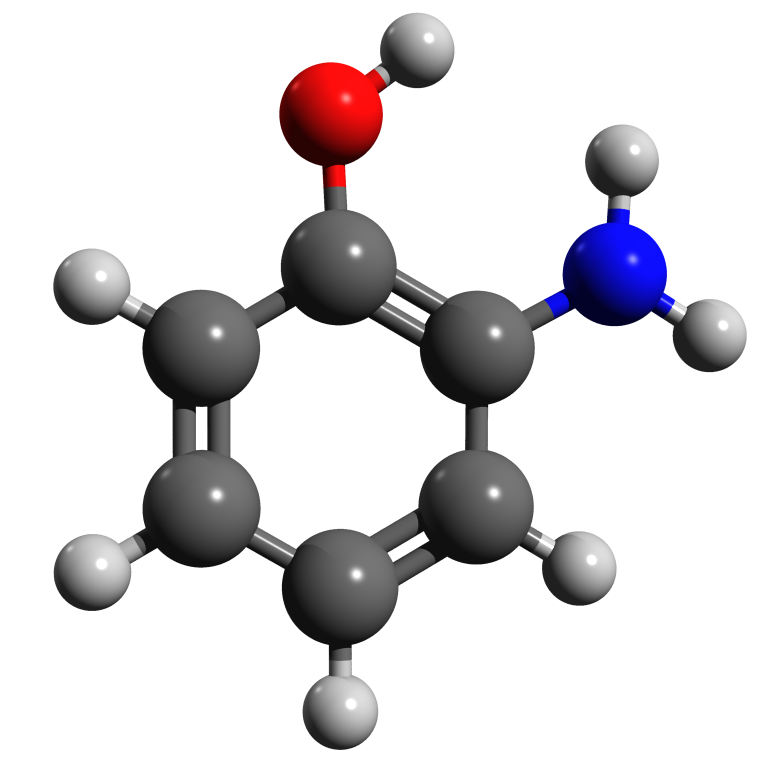
Ball-and-stick model of 2-aminophenol

Names
- Preferred IUPAC name 2-Aminophenol
- Other names o-Aminophenol ortho-Aminophenol; 2-Hydroxyaniline; 2-Amino-1-hydroxybenzene

Identifiers
CAS Number	95-55-6
3D model (JSmol)	Interactive image
ChEBI	CHEBI:18112
ChEMBL	ChEMBL28319
ChemSpider	5596
DrugBank	DB01726
ECHA InfoCard	100.002.211
EC Number	202-431-1
KEGG	C01987
PubChem CID	5801
RTECS number	SJ4950000
UNII	23RH73DZ65
UN number	2512
CompTox Dashboard (EPA)	DTXSID8024498
- InChI: InChI=1S/C6H7NO/c7-5-3-1-2-4-6(5)8/h1-4,8H,7H2 Key: CDAWCLOXVUBKRW-UHFFFAOYSA-N; InChI=1/C6H7NO/c7-5-3-1-2-4-6(5)8/h1-4,8H,7H2 Key: CDAWCLOXVUBKRW-UHFFFAOYAP
- SMILES: Oc1ccccc1N

Properties
Chemical formula	C_{6}H_{7}NO
Molar mass	109.128 g·mol^{−1}
Appearance	White orthorhombic pyramidal needles
Density	1.328 g/cm^{3}
Melting point	174 °C (345 °F; 447 K)
Solubility in water	slightly soluble in cold water, soluble in hot water
Acidity (pK_{a})	4.78 (amino; 20 °C, H_{2}O); 9.97 (phenol; 20 °C, H_{2}O)

Hazards
- GHS labelling
Pictograms	(GHS07: Exclamation mark) (GHS08: Health hazard)
Signal word	Warning
Hazard statements	H302, H332, H341
Precautionary statements	P201, P202, P261, P264, P270, P271, P281, P301+P312, P304+P312, P304+P340, P308+P313, P312, P330, P405, P501
- Except where otherwise noted, data are given for materials in their standard state (at 25 °C [77 °F], 100 kPa). verify (what is ?) Infobox references

2-Aminophenol is an organic compound with the formula C_{6}H_{7}NO. Along with its isomer 4-aminophenol, it is an amphoteric molecule and a reducing agent. It is a useful reagent for the synthesis of dyes and heterocyclic compounds. Reflecting its slight hydrophilic character, white powder is moderately soluble in alcohols and can be recrystallized from hot water.

== Synthesis and structure ==
2-Aminophenol (and its isomer, 4-aminophenol) is industrially synthesized by reducing the corresponding nitrophenol by hydrogen in the presence of various catalysts. The nitrophenols can also be reduced with iron.

The compound exhibits intra- and intermolecular hydrogen bonding involving the neighbouring amine and hydroxyl groups. As a result, 2-aminophenol has a relatively high melting point (174 °C) compared to other compounds with a similar molecular mass; for example, 2-methylphenol melts at 31 °C.

== Applications ==
2-Aminophenol has a variety of uses. As a reducing agent, it is marketed under the names of Atomal and Ortol to develop black-and-white photographs. 2-Aminophenol is an intermediate in the synthesis of dyes. It is particularly useful in yielding metal-complex dyes when diazotized and coupled to a phenol, naphthol, or other aromatic or resonant dye species. Metal complex dyes using copper or chromium are commonly used for producing dull colors. Tridentate ligand dyes are useful because they are more stable than their bi- or mono-dentate counterparts.

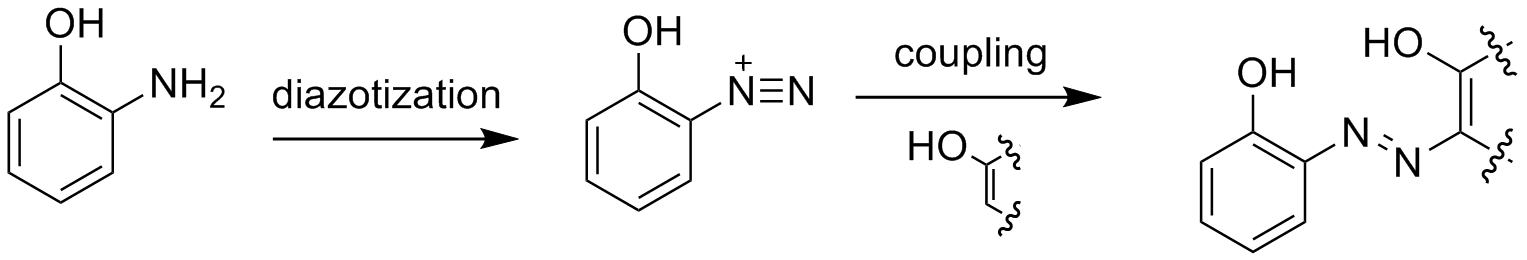
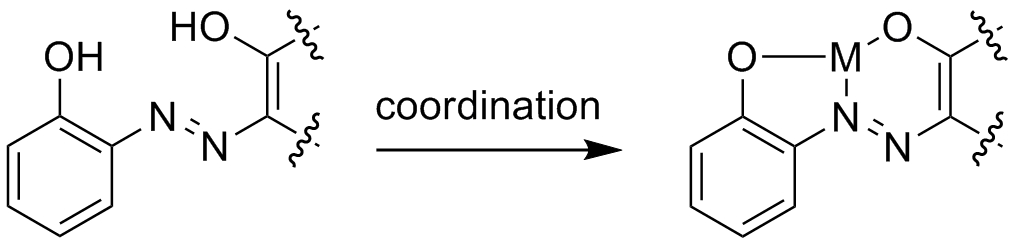

Due to the adjacency of the amino and hydroxyl groups, 2-aminophenol readily forms heterocycles. These heterocycles, such as benzoxazoles, can be biologically active and useful in the pharmaceutical industry:

2-Aminophenol has application in the synthesis of ARN2966, paraxazone, leiopyrrole, arsphenamine, and amoxapine.

The reaction of 2-aminophenol with glycerol leads to 8-hydroxyquinoline. This chemical has some important uses.
