= List of drugs: Cf–Ch =

This multi-page article lists pharmaceutical drugs alphabetically by name. Many drugs have more than one name and, therefore, the same drug may be listed more than once. Brand names and generic names are differentiated by capitalizing brand names.

See also the list of the top 100 bestselling branded drugs, ranked by sales.

Abbreviations are used in the list as follows:

- INN = International nonproprietary name
- BAN = British Approved Name
- USAN = United States Adopted Name
- Two-letter codes for countries

Lists of drugs
1–9 | A | B | C | D | E | F | G | H | I | J | K | L | M | N | O | P | Q | R | S | T | U | V | W | X | Y | Z

Ca | Cb–Ce | Cf–Ch | Ci | Cj–Cl | Cm–Co | Cp–Cz

== cf-cg ==
- CFDN
- CG
- CGP 57148B
- CGP-42446

== ch ==
=== cha-chi ===
- Chanaxin
- Charcadole
- Charcoaid
- Charcocaps
- chaulmosulfone (INN)
- Chealamide
- Chemet
- Chenix
- Chenodal
- chenodeoxycholic acid (INN)
- Cheracol
- Cheratussin DAC
- CHG Scrub
- Chibroxin
- chiniofon (INN)
- ChiRhoStim
- Chirocaine

=== chl ===
==== chlo ====
- Chlo-Amine Oral

===== chlor =====
- Chlor-Pro Injection
- Chlor-Rest Tablet
- Chlor-Trimeton
- Chlor-Tripolon

====== chlora-chlori ======
- chloracyzine (INN)
- Chlorafed Liquid
- chloral hydrate (INN)
- chloralodol (INN)
- chloralose (INN)
- chlorambucil (INN)
- chloramphenicol (INN)
- Chloraprep One-Step Frepp
- Chlorate Oral
- chlorazanil (INN)
- chlorazodin (INN)
- chlorbenzoxamine (INN)
- chlorbetamide (INN)
- chlorcyclizine (INN)
- Chlordiazachel
- chlordiazepoxide (INN)
- chlordimorine (INN)
- Chloresium
- Chlorgest-HD Elixir
- chlorhexidine (INN)
- chlorisondamine chloride (INN)

====== chlorm-chloro ======
- chlormadinone (INN)
- chlormerodrin (197 Hg) (INN)
- chlormerodrin (INN)
- chlormethine (INN)
- chlormezanone (INN)
- chlormidazole (INN)
- chlornaphazine (INN)
- chlorobutanol (INN)
- chlorocresol (INN)
- Chlorofair
- Chlorofon-A Tablet
- Chloromag
- Chloromycetin
- Chloromyxin
- chloroprednisone (INN)
- chloroprocaine (INN)
- Chloroptic-P S.O.P.
- Chloroptic
- chloropyramine (INN)
- chloropyrilene (INN)
- chloroquine (INN)
- chloroserpidine (INN)
- Chloroserpine
- Chlorostat
- chlorothiazide (INN)
- chlorotrianisene (INN)
- chloroxylenol (INN)

====== chlorp-chlorz ======
- Chlorphed
- chlorphenamine (INN)
- chlorphenesin (INN)
- chlorphenoctium amsonate (INN)
- chlorphenoxamine (INN)
- chlorphentermine (INN)
- chlorproethazine (INN)
- chlorproguanil (INN)
- chlorpromazine (INN)
- chlorpropamide (INN)
- chlorprothixene (INN)
- chlorquinaldol (INN)
- Chlortab
- chlortalidone (INN)
- chlortetracycline (INN)
- chlorthenoxazine (INN)
- chlorzoxazone (INN)

=== cho-chy ===
- Cholac
- Cholan-HMB
- Cholebrine
- Choledyl
- cholestyramine (INN)
- Choletec
- choline alfoscerate (INN)
- choline fenofibrate (USAN, INN)
- choline gluconate (INN)
- choline salicylate (INN)
- choline theophyllinate (INN)
- Cholografin Meglumine
- Cholografin Sodium
- Cholovue
- Choloxin
- Cholybar
- Chooz brandname chewing gum with calcium carbonate
- Chorex
- choriogonadotropin alfa (INN)
- chorionic gonadotropin (INN)
- Choron or Chron-10 brandname for chorionic gonadotropin
- Chromalbin
- Chromitope Sodium
- chromocarb (INN)
- Chronovera
- Chronulac
- Chymex
- Chymodiactin
- chymopapain (INN)
- chymotrypsin (INN)
