= Diamine =

Amine with two amino groups

General structure of (primary) diamines. The primary amino groups (NH_{2}) are marked blue,
R is a divalent organic radical (e.g. a para-phenylene group).

A diamine is an amine with two amino groups. Diamines are used as monomers to prepare polyamides, polyimides, and polyureas. The term diamine refers mostly to primary diamines, as those are the most reactive.

== Practical considerations ==
In terms of quantities produced, 1,6-diaminohexane (a precursor to Nylon 6-6) is most important, followed by ethylenediamine. Vicinal diamines (1,2-diamines) are a structural motif in many biological compounds and are used as ligands in coordination chemistry. Many diamines are used as hardeners in the curing of epoxide resins. Putrescine and cadaverine are simple diamines that occur widely in nature.

== Aliphatic diamines ==
=== Linear ===
- 2 carbon backbone: ethylenediamine (1,2-diaminoethane). Related derivatives include the N-alkylated compounds, 1,1-dimethylethylenediamine, 1,2-dimethylethylenediamine, ethambutol, tetrakis(dimethylamino)ethylene, TMEDA. Many 1,2-diamine derivatives are of practical interest such as penicillin.

Ethylenediamine

- 3 carbon backbone: 1,3-diaminopropane (propane-1,3-diamine)
- 4 carbon backbone: putrescine (butane-1,4-diamine)
- 5 carbon backbone: cadaverine (pentane-1,5-diamine)

Cadaverine

- 6 carbon backbone: hexamethylenediamine (hexane-1,6-diamine, HMD). HMD and other long chain diamines can be prepared by hydrocyanation to give dinitrile, which can be hydrogenated.

=== Branched ===
Derivatives of ethylenediamine are prominent:

- 1,2-diaminopropane, which is chiral.
- 2,3-Butanediamine, two diastereomers, one of which is C_{2}-symmetric.
- Diphenylethylenediamine, two diastereomers, one of which is C_{2}-symmetric.
- trimethylhexamethylenediamine, several isomers
- 1,2-Diaminocyclohexane, two diastereomers, one of which is C_{2}-symmetric.

=== Cyclic ===
1,4-Diazacycloheptane

- piperazine ((CH_{2}CH_{2}NH)_{2})
- 1,4-Diazacycloheptane

=== Xylylenediamines ===
Xylylenediamines are classified as alkylamines since the amine is not directly attached to an aromatic ring.

- o-xylylenediamine or OXD
- m-xylylenediamine or MXD
- p-xylylenediamine or PXD

== Aromatic diamines ==
Three phenylenediamines are known:

- o-phenylenediamine or OPD
- m-phenylenediamine or MPD
- p-phenylenediamine or PPD. 2,5-diaminotoluene is related to PPD but contains a methyl group on the ring.

p-phenylenediamine

Various N-methylated derivatives of the phenylenediamines are known:

- dimethyl-4-phenylenediamine, a reagent.
- N,N'-di-2-butyl-1,4-phenylenediamine, an antioxidant.

Examples with two aromatic rings include derivatives of biphenyl and naphthalene:

- 4,4'-diaminobiphenyl
- 1,8-diaminonaphthalene

Structure of Wurster's cation, illustrating the ability of amino substituents to stabilize arene radical cations.

== Geminal diamines ==
Bis(dimethylamino)methane

Geminal diamines (1,1-diamines) are an uncommon class of diamines mainly of academic interest. Of the few that exist, most are di-tertiary amines. Bis(dimethylamino)methane ([(CH_{3})_{2}N]_{2}CH_{2}) is an isolable example.

Geminal diamines with N-H bonds are particularly rare. They are invoked as intermediates in transamination reactions and the reduction of amidines. In aqueous conditions they preferentially eliminate the less basic amine to leave an iminium ion. Some stable geminal diamines have been isolated. The parent gem-diamine is methylenediamine (diaminomethane), which again is mainly of theoretical interest.
