= C4H12N2 =

The molecular formula C_{4}H_{12}N_{2} (molar mass: 88.15 g/mol) may refer to:

- Dimethylethylenediamines
  - 1,1-Dimethylethylenediamine
  - 1,2-Dimethylethylenediamine
- 2,3-Butanediamine
- Putrescine
- Tetramethylhydrazine
- Tert-Butylhydrazine
