= Bisphenol A bis(phthalic anhydride) =

Identifiers
| CAS Number | 38103-06-9 |
| 3D model (JSmol) | Interactive image |
| ChEMBL | ChEMBL3560133 |
| ChemSpider | 85265 |
| ECHA InfoCard | 100.048.875 |
| EC Number | 253-781-7 |
| PubChem CID | 94483 |
| UNII | AX6B5HRE2H |
| CompTox Dashboard (EPA) | DTXSID3028001 |
- InChI: InChI=1S/C31H20O8/c1-31(2,17-3-7-19(8-4-17)36-21-11-13-23-25(15-21)29(34)38-27(23)32)18-5-9-20(10-6-18)37-22-12-14-24-26(16-22)30(35)39-28(24)33/h3-16H,1-2H3 Key: MQAHXEQUBNDFGI-UHFFFAOYSA-N
- SMILES: CC(C)(C1=CC=C(C=C1)OC2=CC3=C(C=C2)C(=O)OC3=O)C4=CC=C(C=C4)OC5=CC6=C(C=C5)C(=O)OC6=O
- Except where otherwise noted, data are given for materials in their standard state (at 25 °C [77 °F], 100 kPa). Infobox references

Bisphenol A bis(phthalic anhydride) (BPADA) is an organic chemical compound and a carboxylic acid anhydride. It consists of a bisphenol A molecule linked to two phthalic anhydride molecules via ether bridges.

BPADA is an important monomer for polyetherimides and polyimides, which are classified as high-performance plastics. Bisphenol A bis(phthalic anhydride) is also the starting material for bisphenol A tetracarboxylic acid, which was recently described under the name "lockdown" as an inhibitor of phosphatases PPM1F and is supposed to prevent the metastasis of tumor cells.

== Production ==
On a laboratory scale, bisphenol A bis(phthalic anhydride) can be synthesized from the disodium salt of bisphenol A (BPA) with a halogen-substituted phthalic anhydride in the 4-position, such as 4-fluorophthalic anhydride.

Synthesis of bisphenol-A-bis(phthalic anhydride) with 4-fluorophthalic anhydride

Using the phase transfer catalyst hexaethylguanidinium chloride, BPADA is obtained in 90% yield via a Williamson ether synthesis.

The industrial-scale synthesis of 4,4′-bisphenol-A-bis(phthalic anhydride) starts from N-methylphthalimide (derived from phthalic anhydride and methylamine), followed by nitration (using nitrating acid) to form N-methyl-4-nitrophthalimide (4-NPI). Small quantities of the 3-isomer are also produced, but they can be easily separated. During the reaction of 4-NPI with the sodium salt of bisphenol A, the bis(phthalimide) is formed, which is then hydrolyzed to the tetracarboxylic acid and subsequently dehydrated (e.g. with an acetic acid/acetic anhydride mixture) to yield the dianhydride.

A simplified process converts bisphenol A bisphthalimide to bisphenol A bis(phthalic anhydride) via an imide–anhydride exchange reaction. The reaction occurs in an aqueous phthalic acid solution and is catalyzed by a tertiary amine, such as dimethylbutylamine.

Synthesis of bisphenol-A-bis(phthalic anhydride) with N-methylphthalimide

== Properties ==
Bisphenol-A-bis(phthalic anhydride) in its pure form is a white crystalline powder that is practically insoluble in water. It dissolves in aprotic dipolar solvents such as dimethylformamide and dimethylacetamide. It also dissolves in alkalis, forming the salt of 4,4′-bisphenol-A-tetracarboxylic acid.

== Applications ==
Due to its difunctional cyclic compounds carboxylic anhydride structure, bisphenol-A-bis(phthalic anhydride)] serves as a hardener for heat-resistant epoxy resins and for polyimides. It is also a key molecular building block for polyetherimides (PEI), for example in reactions with phenylenediamines (PPD):

PEI synthesis with bisphenol A bis(phthalic anhydride)

To achieve high molecular weights with improved properties (e.g. color, transparency, and water absorption), high-purity BPADA and precise stoichiometry of the reactants are required, since the polymerization proceeds via polycondensation. Analogous to the formation of hexamethylenediamine adipate in the production of polyamides, the bisphenol A tetracarboxylic acid obtained by hydrolysis of BPADA can react with diamines to form a stoichiometric salt, which polymerizes at approximately 200 °C to yield high-molecular-weight polyimides.

PEI synthesis with bisphenol-A-bis(phthalic anhydride) PEI from AH-analogous salt

BPADA imparts advantageous properties to the resulting polymers, such as good solubility in organic solvents (e.g. N-methyl-2-pyrrolidone, dimethylacetamide, chloroform, and tetrahydrofuran), enabling their use in temperature-resistant paints, coatings, and films. Its low water absorption, low dielectric constant, high transparency, and strong adhesion to metal surfaces—especially compared to the standard dianhydride pyromellitic dianhydride (PMDA)—make BPADA particularly suitable for electronic applications.

Bisphenol-A-bis(phthalic anhydride) and its derived polyimides are marketed under the brand name Ultem, such as Ultem 1000 (with the diamine phenylenediamine) and Ultem 5000 (with phenylenediamine), developed by General Electric and now produced and distributed by Saudi Basic Industries Corporation.

A recent publication reports on the in vitro activity of the BPADA hydrolysis product BPADA-tetracarboxylic acid (referred to as "lockdown") as an inhibitor of phosphatases PPM1F, which are often overexpressed in tumor cells. The hydrolysis of the more membrane-permeable precursor BPADA-tetracarboxylic acid tetraethyl ester (designated "Lockdown^{Pro}"), mediated by endogenous esterases, yields the active compound BPADA-tetracarboxylic acid. This compound is reported to act as an effective PPM1F inhibitor that suppresses tumor cell metastasis. Further studies are required to confirm the in vivo efficacy of such polyvalent crosslinkers and to explore their potential as therapeutic agents for preventing tumor metastasis.
