= Chymopapain S =

Chymopapain S may refer to one of two enzymes:

- Chymopapain
- Caricain
