= Diaminobenzene =

Diaminobenzene can refer to three different isomers, which are also termed phenylenediamines:

- 1,2-diaminobenzene
- 1,3-diaminobenzene
- 1,4-diaminobenzene
