= Dimethylethylenediamine =

Dimethylethylenediamine may refer to:

- 1,1-Dimethylethylenediamine
- 1,2-Dimethylethylenediamine (DMEDA)
