= Clemizole =

Chemical compound

Clinical data
- Trade names: Allercur, Histacur
- Other names: EPX-100
- ATC code: None

Identifiers
- IUPAC name: 1-[(4-Chlorophenyl)methyl]-2-(pyrrolidin-1-ylmethyl)benzimidazole
- CAS Number: 442-52-4
- PubChem CID: 2782
- ChemSpider: 2680
- UNII: T97CB3796L
- KEGG: D13060
- ChEBI: CHEBI:52140
- ChEMBL: ChEMBL1407943
- NIAID ChemDB: 033090
- CompTox Dashboard (EPA): DTXSID0046939
- ECHA InfoCard: 100.006.486

Chemical and physical data
- Formula: C_{19}H_{20}ClN_{3}
- Molar mass: 325.84 g·mol^{−1}
- 3D model (JSmol): Interactive image
- SMILES: Clc1ccc(cc1)Cn3c(nc2ccccc23)CN4CCCC4
- InChI: InChI=1S/C19H20ClN3/c20-16-9-7-15(8-10-16)13-23-18-6-2-1-5-17(18)21-19(23)14-22-11-3-4-12-22/h1-2,5-10H,3-4,11-14H2; Key:CJXAEXPPLWQRFR-UHFFFAOYSA-N

Clemizole, sold under the brand names Allercur and Histacur, is a histamine H_{1} receptor antagonist of the benzimidazole group described as an antihistamine, antipruritic, and sedative which is no longer marketed. It is a first-generation antihistamine.

It is also a serotonin receptor agonist and is being studied for the potential treatment of Dravet syndrome, Lennox–Gastaut syndrome, and epilepsy under the development code name EPX-100. The drug is said to act specifically as a serotonin 5-HT_{2} receptor agonist, with prominent affinity for the serotonin 5-HT_{2A} and 5-HT_{2B} receptors having been reported. On the other hand, it showed markedly lower affinity for the serotonin 5-HT_{2C} receptor. Clemizole also showed affinity for several other receptors.

The drug was first described in the scientific literature by 1952. Its serotonin receptor agonist and anticonvulsant properties were discovered in 2017.

== Chemistry ==
=== Synthesis ===
Benzimidazoles substituted with an alkylamine at position 2 have a venerable history as H_{1} antihistaminic agents. The standard starting material for many benzimidazoles consists of phenylenediamine, or its derivatives.

Clemizole synthesis:

Reaction of that compound with chloroacetic acid can be rationalized by invoking initial formation of the chloromethyl amide. Imide formation with the remaining free amino group closes the ring to afford 2-chloromethyl benzimidazole (3). Displacement of halogen with pyrrolidine affords the alkylation product. The proton on the fused imidazole nitrogen is then removed by reaction with sodium hydride. Treatment of the resulting anion with α,4-dichlorotoluene gives the H_{1} antihistaminic agent clemizole (5).

== See also ==
- Chlormidazole
