= CH6N2 =

The molecular formula CH_{6}N_{2} (molar mass: 46.07 g/mol, exact mass: 46.0531 u) may refer to:

- Methanediamine
- Monomethylhydrazine (mono-methyl hydrazine, MMH)
