= Leeuwenhoekiella polynyae =

Scientific classification
- Domain: Bacteria
- Kingdom: Pseudomonadati
- Phylum: Bacteroidota
- Class: Flavobacteriia
- Order: Flavobacteriales
- Family: Flavobacteriaceae
- Genus: Leeuwenhoekiella
- Species: L. polynyae

Binomial name
- Leeuwenhoekiella polynyae Si et al. 2015

Type strain
- JCM 30387, KCTC 42185, soj2014-1

Synonyms
- Leeuwenhoekiella antarctica, Leeuwenhoekiella polynyensis

Species of bacterium

Leeuwenhoekiella polynyae is a Gram-negative, rod-shaped, strictly aerobic and motile bacterium from the genus of Leeuwenhoekiella which has been isolated from water from the polynya in the Antarctic Ocean. L. polynyae is oxidase and catalase positive. The species has an optimum growth temperature of 25 °C.
