= Leeuwenhoekiella nanhaiensis =

Scientific classification
- Domain: Bacteria
- Kingdom: Pseudomonadati
- Phylum: Bacteroidota
- Class: Flavobacteriia
- Order: Flavobacteriales
- Family: Flavobacteriaceae
- Genus: Leeuwenhoekiella
- Species: L. nanhaiensis

Binomial name
- Leeuwenhoekiella nanhaiensis Liu et al. 2016

Type strain
- CCTCC AB 2015204, KCTC 42729, G18

Species of bacterium

Leeuwenhoekiella nanhaiensis is a Gram-negative, heterotrophic, rod-shaped and aerobic bacterium from the genus of Leeuwenhoekiella which has been isolated from deep-sea water from the South China Sea. Its species name is derived from Nanhai, the chinese name for the South China Sea. L. nanhaiensis has an optimum growth pressure of 0.1 Mpa, which is lower than the depth from which it was isolated. Growth occurs between 4-40 °C; however, the optimum growth temperature is between 28-32 °C.The species is catalase and oxidase positive.
