= Leeuwenhoekiella blandensis =

Scientific classification
- Domain: Bacteria
- Kingdom: Pseudomonadati
- Phylum: Bacteroidota
- Class: Flavobacteriia
- Order: Flavobacteriales
- Family: Flavobacteriaceae
- Genus: Leeuwenhoekiella
- Species: L. blandensis

Binomial name
- Leeuwenhoekiella blandensis Pinhassi et al. 2006

Type strain
- CCUG 51940, CECT 7118, KCTC 22103, LMG 28563, MED 217

Species of bacterium

Leeuwenhoekiella blandensis is a species of gram-negative, heterotrophic, rod-shaped and aerobic bacterium from the genus of Leeuwenhoekiella which has been isolated from seawater from the Mediterranean Sea.
