= Tert-Butylhydrazine =

tert-Butylhydrazine

Identifiers
CAS Number	32064-67-8
3D model (JSmol)	Interactive image
ChemSpider	73898
ECHA InfoCard	100.190.618
EC Number	664-395-7
PubChem CID	81890
CompTox Dashboard (EPA)	DTXSID90185875
- InChI: InChI=1S/C4H12N2/c1-4(2,3)6-5/h6H,5H2,1-3H3 Key: MUQNAPSBHXFMHT-UHFFFAOYSA-N
- SMILES: CC(C)(C)NN

Properties
Chemical formula	C_{4}H_{12}N_{2}
Molar mass	88.154 g·mol^{−1}

Hazards
- GHS labelling
Pictograms	(GHS02: Flammable) (GHS05: Corrosive) (GHS06: Toxic) (GHS09: Environmental hazard)
Signal word	Danger
Hazard statements	H225, H301, H311, H314, H331, H351
Precautionary statements	P203, P210, P233, P240, P241, P242, P243, P260, P262, P264, P270, P271, P280, P301+P316, P301+P330+P331, P302+P352, P302+P361+P354, P303+P361+P353, P304+P340, P305+P354+P338, P316, P318, P321, P330, P361+P364, P363, P370+P378, P403+P233, P403+P235, P405, P501
- Except where otherwise noted, data are given for materials in their standard state (at 25 °C [77 °F], 100 kPa). Infobox references

tert-Butylhydrazine is a chemical compound belonging to the class of hydrazines.

== Synthesis ==
tert-Butylhydrazine can be obtained by the hydrolysis of benzophenone tert-butylhydrazone, which in turn can be prepared by reacting diphenyldiazomethane with tert-butylmagnesium chloride.

== Reactions ==
tert-Butylhydrazine reacts with suitable carbonyl groups to form pyrazoles.

== Uses ==
tert-Butylhydrazine is used in the synthesis of insecticides. Active ingredients of the dibenzoylhydrazine class—methoxyfenozide, tebufenozide, halofenozide, chromafenozide, and fufenozide—contain a tert-butylhydrazine moiety as a central structural element essential for their activity. These insecticides, used particularly against the larvae of butterflies (Lepidoptera), act as agonists of the ecdysone receptor and kill pests by inducing premature molting. In the synthesis of these active ingredients, tert-butylhydrazine undergoes acylation with various carboxylic acid chlorides.

tert-Butylhydrazine is a reducing agent. Because it can reduce neptunium and plutonium present in high oxidation states, it is being investigated—along with many other compounds—as a reagent for reprocessing.
