= Chlorodi-tert-butylphosphine =

Names
- Other names: Di-tert-butylchlorophosphine; Di-tert-butylphosphinous chloride

Identifiers
CAS Number	13716-10-4
3D model (JSmol)	Interactive image
ChemSpider	123086
ECHA InfoCard	100.119.729
EC Number	604-003-3
PubChem CID	139566
CompTox Dashboard (EPA)	DTXSID70160089
- InChI: InChI=1S/C8H18ClP/c1-7(2,3)10(9)8(4,5)6/h1-6H3 Key: MCRSZLVSRGTMIH-UHFFFAOYSA-N
- SMILES: CC(C)(C)P(C(C)(C)C)Cl

Properties
Chemical formula	C_{8}H_{18}ClP
Molar mass	180.66 g·mol^{−1}
Density	0.95 g·cm^{−3}

Hazards
- GHS labelling
Pictograms	(GHS05: Corrosive)
Signal word	Danger
Hazard statements	H314
Precautionary statements	P260, P264, P280, P301+P330+P331, P302+P361+P354, P304+P340, P305+P354+P338, P316, P321, P363, P405, P501
- Except where otherwise noted, data are given for materials in their standard state (at 25 °C [77 °F], 100 kPa). Infobox references

Chlorodi-tert-butylphosphine is a chemical compound belonging to the group of phosphanes.

== Synthesis ==
Chlorodi-tert-butylphosphine can be prepared by reacting phosphorus trichloride with tert-butylmagnesium chloride. Further reaction to form tri-tert-butylphosphine does not occur.

== Reactions ==
Chlorodi-tert-butylphosphine can be reduced to di-tert-butylphosphine by reaction with lithium aluminum hydride. Reaction with tert-butyllithium converts it to tri-tert-butylphosphine.
