= Glycyl endopeptidase =

Identifiers
- EC no.: 3.4.22.25
- CAS no.: 149719-24-4

Databases
- IntEnz: IntEnz view
- BRENDA: BRENDA entry
- ExPASy: NiceZyme view
- KEGG: KEGG entry
- MetaCyc: metabolic pathway
- PRIAM: profile
- PDB structures: RCSB PDB PDBe PDBsum
Search
- PMC: articles
- PubMed: articles
- NCBI: proteins

Glycyl endopeptidase (EC 3.4.22.25, papaya peptidase B, papaya proteinase IV, glycine-specific proteinase, chymopapain, Papaya proteinase 4, PPIV, chymopapain M) is an enzyme. This enzyme catalyses the following chemical reaction

Preferential cleavage: Gly-, in proteins and small molecule substrates

This enzyme is isolated from the papaya plant, Carica papaya.
