= Tri-tert-butylphosphine =

Names
- IUPAC name Tris(1,1-dimethylethyl)phosphine

Identifiers
CAS Number	13716-12-6
3D model (JSmol)	Interactive image
ChemSpider	75504
ECHA InfoCard	100.033.864
EC Number	237-266-4
PubChem CID	83681
CompTox Dashboard (EPA)	DTXSID80160090
- InChI: InChI=1S/C12H27P/c1-10(2,3)13(11(4,5)6)12(7,8)9/h1-9H3 Key: BWHDROKFUHTORW-UHFFFAOYSA-N
- SMILES: P(C(C)(C)C)(C(C)(C)C)C(C)(C)C

Properties
Chemical formula	C_{12}H_{27}P
Molar mass	202.322 g·mol^{−1}

Hazards
- GHS labelling
Pictograms	(GHS02: Flammable) (GHS05: Corrosive)
Signal word	Danger
Hazard statements	H250, H314
Precautionary statements	P210, P222, P231, P233, P260, P264, P264+P265, P280, P301+P330+P331, P302+P335+P334, P302+P361+P354, P304+P340, P305+P354+P338, P316, P317, P321, P363, P370+P378, P405, P501
- Except where otherwise noted, data are given for materials in their standard state (at 25 °C [77 °F], 100 kPa). Infobox references

Tri-tert-butylphosphine is an organic compound belonging to the phosphine class.

== History ==
The synthesis of tri-tert-butylphosphine was first reported in 1967.

== Synthesis ==
Due to steric hindrance, the reaction of phosphorus trichloride with tert-butylmagnesium chloride yields only chloro-di-tert-butylphosphine. However, this compound can be reacted with tert-butyllithium to produce tri-tert-butylphosphine. In the presence of 10 mol% copper(I) iodide and 20 mol% lithium bromide, tri-tert-butylphosphine can also be synthesized without using organolithium compounds, by reacting phosphorus trichloride or chloro-di-tert-butylphosphine with tert-butylmagnesium chloride.

== Properties ==
Tri-tert-butylphosphine crystallizes in the space group P2_{1}/c (No. 14) with the lattice parameters a = 9.219 Å, b = 13.768 Å, c = 11.133 Å, and β = 111.36°. The unit cell contains 4 formula units.

== Reactions ==
Tri-tert-butylphosphine serves as a ligand in catalysts used for palladium-catalyzed cross-coupling reactions, such as Suzuki couplings. As a sterically bulky Lewis base, tri-tert-butylphosphine can form frustrated Lewis pairs with suitable Lewis acids, such as tris(pentafluorophenyl)borane.

The reaction of tri-tert-butylphosphine with selenium in toluene yields tri-tert-butylphosphine selenide. Similarly, its reaction with the pyridine adduct of phosphenodithionyl chloride yields tri-tert-butylphosphine sulfide. It reacts violently with iodomethane to form a phosphonium salt.

== Deuterated Tri-tert-butylphosphine ==
For the preparation of deuterated compounds tri-tert-butylphosphine, tert-butyl chloride is first reacted with thionyl chloride in heavy water to produce tert-butyl chloride-d_{9}. This compound is then reacted with magnesium in tetrahydrofuran to produce tert-butylmagnesium chloride-d_{9}, which can subsequently be reacted with phosphorus trichloride to obtain tri-tert-butylphosphine-d_{27}.
