= Leeuwenhoekiella marinoflava =

Scientific classification
- Domain: Bacteria
- Kingdom: Pseudomonadati
- Phylum: Bacteroidota
- Class: Flavobacteriia
- Order: Flavobacteriales
- Family: Flavobacteriaceae
- Genus: Leeuwenhoekiella
- Species: L. marinoflava

Binomial name
- Leeuwenhoekiella marinoflava (Reichenbach 1989) Nedashkovskaya et al. 2005

Type strain
- ATCC 19326, DSM 2042, DSM 3653, IAM 14116, IFO 14170, IFO 15939, JCM 31008, JCM 8517, KCTC 2915, LMG 1345, NBRC 14170, NBRC 15939, NCIMB 397, NCMB 397, Reichenbach Cy m 1, SW1

Synonyms
- Cytophaga mariniflava, Cytophaga marinoflava

Species of bacterium

Leeuwenhoekiella marinoflava is a species of gram-negative bacteria from the genus of Leeuwenhoekiella which was first isolated from seawater from Scotland.
