= Caricain =

Type of enzyme

Identifiers
- EC no.: 3.4.22.30
- CAS no.: 39307-22-7

Databases
- BRENDA: enzyme data
- ExPASy: NiceZyme view
- KEGG: enzyme entry
- MetaCyc: metabolic pathway
- Rhea: reactions
- PDB structures: RCSB PDB PDBe PDBsum
Search
- PMC: articles
- PubMed: articles
- NCBI: proteins

Caricain (EC 3.4.22.30, papaya peptidase A, papaya peptidase II, papaya proteinase, papaya proteinase III, papaya proteinase 3, proteinase omega, papaya proteinase A, chymopapain S, Pp) is an enzyme. This enzyme catalyses the following chemical reaction: Hydrolysis of proteins with broad specificity for peptide bonds, similar to those of papain and chymopapain

This enzyme is isolated from the papaya plant, Carica papaya.

== Name and History ==
The first description of this enzyme was provided by Schack, who named it papaya peptidase A. The same enzyme has since been given a number of different names, including papaya peptidase II, papaya proteinase III and papaya proteinase. The name caricain was recommended by NC-IUBMB in 1992.

== Structural Chemistry ==
Caricain is synthesized as a preproenzyme. There is evidence at the mRNA level for polymorphism, two very similar clones being isolated, one of which contained a C-terminal extension. The primary structure of the mature form of the enzyme has been determined, and is as predicted from one of the cDNA sequences. The protein is 216 amino acids in length, and is 68% identical in sequence to papain, 65% to chymopapain and 81% to glycyl endopeptidase. The three disulfide bonds are conserved between all the papaya proteinases, and there is no evidence for glycosylation. Caricain is an extremely basic protein, with pI estimated to be 11.7. The A280,1% is reported to be 18.3, giving a molar extinction coefficient of 4.193 104 M21 cm21.

As with some other plant cysteine endopeptidases, caricain exhibits charge heterogeneity. This may be partly due to variation in the oxidization state of the active-site sulfur, as is the case with homologous enzymes from pineapple stem, although genetic polymorphism may also contribute.

The crystal structure of caricain has been solved to a resolution of 1.8 A ̊, and demonstrates main-chain conformation very similar to that of papain. Caricain has four amino acid residues (Ser169-Lys172) not present in papain, but it is papain that is exceptional at this point in the sequence, showing a deletion not seen in other members of the family. The architecture of the active site of caricain is very similar to that of papain.

== Preparation ==
The highly basic character of caricain makes it relatively easy to separate from the other papaya cysteine endopeptidases in cation-exchange chromatography of preparations of commercially available papaya latex. A sodium acetate gradient, pH 5.0, was first used successfully by Robinson and has since been adopted by others. Caricain is found in the latest-eluting protein peak. Due to the charge heterogeneity of caricain the peak may not be symmetrical, but this does not necessarily indicate the presence of contaminants. Covalent chromatography on thiol-Sepharose allows isolation of fully active caricain from the material obtained by cation exchange.

== Activity and Specificity ==
In common with most enzymes in family C1, caricain accepts hydrophobic amino acid residues in both S2 and S3. However, other residues are also accommodated in these subsites, including proline in S2, and lysine in S3. The specificities of three cysteine endopeptidases from papaya latex were found to be very similar. Caricain and chymopapain appeared to prefer an aliphatic to a hydrophobic residue at P2. The similarity in specificity of caricain and chymopapain was demonstrated by the fact that, of 44 peptide bonds in manatee hemoglobin cleaved by caricain, 29 were also cleaved by chymopapain. An earlier study had highlighted the similarity in specificity of caricain, chymopapain and papain. All seven bonds of the oxidized B chain of insulin that were hydrolyzed by caricain were also cleaved by papain, and six were hydrolyzed by chymopapain.

Caricain can be assayed with Bz-ArgkNHPhNO2, kcat/Km being 187 M21 s21 at pH 6.8 and 40˚C. More sensitive substrates may employ a fluorometric leaving group, kcat/Km for the hydrolysis of Z-Phe-ArgkNHMec being 1.06 3 106 M21 s21 (pH 6.8, 40˚C). The enzyme exhibits a broad pH-activity profile, with the optimum near 7.0. About half-maximal activity is still achieved at pH values of about 5.3 and 8.3, and the profile is reported to be governed by at least three ionizing groups. The active-site sulfur requires reduction for catalytic competence, and this is best achieved by the inclusion of low millimolar concentrations of cysteine in assay buffers.

Caricain is inactivated by E-64, making the inhibitor a convenient active-site titrant, and it is inhibited by cystatins, Ki for inhibition by papaya cystatin being 1.5 nM.

== Relevant Pharmacokinetics ==
The structure of procaricain shows a pro-region connected to an active enzyme. Caricain is regarded as a cysteine endopeptidase, that is, it functions through the action of a cysteine residue at its active site and it is capable of hydrolysing peptide bonds that are well within the N-terminus and C-terminus of the substrate.

With proenzymes, the pharmacokinetics would be governed normally by the rate of intramolecular cleavage to produce the active form of the enzyme. The catalytic site is located in a cleft between two lobes and binding of the substrate needs to occur before activity is available. However, as the active form is the one which is present in the processed latex, the rate limiting step in the reaction with proteins will be simply the conversion of the enzyme-substrate complex to product with the regeneration of the enzyme. The hydrolysis of a peptide bond is however, an automatically favourable reaction. Proteolytic enzymes, such as caricain, catalyse the hydrolysis of a peptide bond at rates which depend upon certain chemical groups from amino acids in the neighbourhood of this bond. Hydrolysis is generally confined to peptides made from amino acids of the L-configuration. The rate varies linearly with low substrate concentration (first-order kinetics) and becomes independent at high concentrations of substrate (zero order kinetics).

The kinetics depends upon the rapid formation of an enzyme substrate complex which is then slowly converted to the product in the rate determining step which regenerates the enzyme. Where the concentration of the enzyme is much less than the concentration of the substrate, the rate of reaction is directly proportional to the total enzyme concentration. The hydrolysis of a peptide bond however is an energetically favourable reaction.

Recent experiments with both crude caricain and purified caricain indicated that the reaction which controls detoxification of a wheat gliadin digest at pH7.5 and 37 °C was indeed a 1st order reaction with a rate constant of 1.7 x 10 ^{−4} sec.^{−1}. The rate of reaction was followed by the disappearance of gliadin peptides which were toxic to rat liver lysosomes.

== Uses ==
=== Gluten related disorders ===
Gluten is a structural protein naturally found in certain cereal grains, in the medical literature gluten is referred as the combination of prolamin and glutelin proteins naturally occurring in all grains that have been proven capable of triggering celiac disease. Specific immunogenic peptides in gliadin, a class of proteins present in wheat and several other cereals, have the ability to provoke an autoimmune enteropathy caused by an abnormal immune response in genetically susceptible individuals with coeliac disease and other gluten related disorders.

Enzyme therapy for gluten related disorders proposes the use of highly targeted proline and glutamine-specific endoproteases to destroy the immunogenic gluten peptides before these interact with the intestinal lining. In vitro studies demonstrated that caricain offered a high degree of protection against the toxic action of gliadin on rat liver lysosomes and was capable of rapidly digesting the key immuno-reactive gluten epitopes associated with the pathology of celiac disease.
