= Leeuwenhoekiella =

Scientific classification
- Domain: Bacteria
- Kingdom: Pseudomonadati
- Phylum: Bacteroidota
- Class: Flavobacteriia
- Order: Flavobacteriales
- Family: Flavobacteriaceae
- Genus: Leeuwenhoekiella; Nedashkovskaya et al. 2005

Type species
- Leeuwenhoekiella marinoflava

Species
- L. aequorea L. aestuarii L. blandensis L. marinoflava L. nanhaiensis L. palythoae L. polynyae

Synonyms
- Leeuwenhoekella

Genus of bacteria

Leeuwenhoekiella is a strictly aerobic bacterial genus from the family of Flavobacteriaceae. Leeuwenhoekiella species are gram-negative bacteria. The genus contains 7 validly published species.
