= Meralluride =

Names
- IUPAC name [3-[(4-Hydroxy-4-oxobutanoyl)carbamoylamino]-2-methoxypropyl]mercury hydroxide

Identifiers
CAS Number	140-20-5
3D model (JSmol)	Interactive image
ChemSpider	19975270
PubChem CID	101626
UNII	LJ423706OE
- InChI: InChI=1S/C9H15N2O5.Hg.H2O/c1-6(16-2)5-10-9(15)11-7(12)3-4-8(13)14;;/h6H,1,3-5H2,2H3,(H,13,14)(H2,10,11,12,15);;1H2/q;+1;/p-1 Key: ZRXNZKPGLBQLJV-UHFFFAOYSA-M; InChI=1/C9H15N2O5.Hg.H2O/c1-6(16-2)5-10-9(15)11-7(12)3-4-8(13)14;;/h6H,1,3-5H2,2H3,(H,13,14)(H2,10,11,12,15);;1H2/q;+1;/p-1/rC9H16HgN2O6/c1-18-6(4-10-17)5-11-9(16)12-7(13)2-3-8(14)15/h6,17H,2-5H2,1H3,(H,14,15)(H2,11,12,13,16) Key: ZRXNZKPGLBQLJV-RFUSTNNRAA
- SMILES: COC(CNC(=O)NC(=O)CCC(=O)O)C[Hg].O

Properties
Chemical formula	C_{9}H_{16}HgN_{2}O_{6}
Molar mass	448.827 g·mol^{−1}
- Except where otherwise noted, data are given for materials in their standard state (at 25 °C [77 °F], 100 kPa). verify (what is ?) Infobox references

Meralluride is a mercurial diuretic.

In a 1963 study done with rats, it was thought to act on the proximal tubules of the kidneys. Studies in the late 1970s showed the compound had antimicrobial effect against Proteus bacteria responsible for urinary tract infections, with varying degrees of effectiveness based on the substances mixed with the drug.

Published toxicity reports include one patient who "experienced violent delayed febrile reactions after the fifth, sixth, and seventh intramuscular injections of Mercuhydrin". Studies from Japan showed the compound caused ventricular fibrillation in a high percentage of animals when compared to furosemide; the furosemide was found to be easier to administer to patients in increasing doses without these side-effects.
