= Leeuwenhoekiella palythoae =

Scientific classification
- Domain: Bacteria
- Kingdom: Pseudomonadati
- Phylum: Bacteroidota
- Class: Flavobacteriia
- Order: Flavobacteriales
- Family: Flavobacteriaceae
- Genus: Leeuwenhoekiella
- Species: L. palythoae

Binomial name
- Leeuwenhoekiella palythoae Nedashkovskaya et al. 2009

Type strain
- KCTC 22020, KMM 6264, LMG 24856, Mikhailov 30-P-B16, Vancanneyt R-30326

Species of bacterium

Leeuwenhoekiella palythoae is a species of gram-negative, heterotrophic, strictly aerobic bacterium from the genus of Leeuwenhoekiella. Cells demonstrate gliding motility and are approximately 0.4-0.5 μm in width and 1.4-3.2 μm in length On marine agar, colonies are circular with yellow-orange coloration. The DNA G+C content is 41.2 mol%.
