= Mercurophylline =

Organic mercury compound

Names
- IUPAC names: Sodium; 1,3-dimethyl-7H-purine-2,6-dione; mercury(2+); 3-(2-methoxypropylcarbamoyl)-1,2,2-trimethylcyclopentane-1-carboxylate; Hydroxide
- Other names: Mercupurin; Mercurin; Mercurofilina; Mercurophyllinum; Novurite

Identifiers
CAS Number	8012-34-8
3D model (JSmol)	Interactive image
ChemSpider	99682
PubChem CID	135068819
UNII	02EP81D4NI
- InChI: InChI=1S/C14H24NO4.C7H8N4O2.Hg.Na.H2O/c1-9(19-5)8-15-11(16)10-6-7-14(4,12(17)18)13(10,2)3;1-10-5-4(8-3-9-5)6(12)11(2)7(10)13;;;/h9-10H,1,6-8H2,2-5H3,(H,15,16)(H,17,18);3H,1-2H3,(H,8,9);;;1H2/q;;2*+1;/p-2 Key: NBORQZFOOXTYMX-UHFFFAOYSA-L
- SMILES: [Na+].[OH-].[Hg+]CC(OC)CNC(=O)C1CCC(C([O-])=O)(C)C1(C)C.O=C2N(C1NCNC1C(=O)N2C)C

Properties
Chemical formula	C_{21}H_{32}HgN_{5}NaO_{7}
Molar mass	690.097 g·mol^{−1}
Appearance	Solid

Hazards
- Occupational safety and health (OHS/OSH)
Main hazards	Mercury poisoning
- Except where otherwise noted, data are given for materials in their standard state (at 25 °C [77 °F], 100 kPa). Infobox references

Mercurophylline is a mercurial diuretic, having the form of white or yellow odorless powder under room temperature. It was formerly used as medicine, administered through injection or tablets.

Mercurophyllin is poisonous when administered subcutaneously, intraperitoneally and intravenously. When administered intravenously, it can cause cardiac arrhythmia. Prolonged oral administration can lead to gastrointestinal irritation and kidney damage.
