= Metal complexes of diamines =

Metal complexes of diamines refers to coordination complexs of diamine ligands. The most common complexes are those of ethylenediamine. Complexes of en and related diamines have been thoroughly studied for their fundamental properties. In a practical sense, diamines are mainly used to make polyamides such as nylon 66, not coordination complexes. These complexes are closely related to metal ammine complexes.

== Ligand properties of diamines ==
Diamines have properties expected for two amines, i.e. they are dibasic and bind well to hard Lewis acids, such as metal cations.

The coordination chemistry of diamines emphasizes 1,2- and 1,3-diamines, which form 5- and 6-membered chelate rings. Both enthalpic and entropic factors favor their formation. 1,4- and longer diamines are floppy, often forming coordination polymers vs chelate rings. For ethylenediamine complexes, the five-membered MN_{2}C_{2} chelate ring is nonplanar and exists in two rapidly interconverting conformations, referred to as δ and λ.

Of the ditertiary diamines, tetramethylethylenediamine (TMEDA) is most commonly encountered. Being bulky and lacking N-H bonds, it is popular as a ligand in main group chemistry.

== Complexes ==
Structure of the Δ-(lel)_{3} (or Δ-(λλλ)) isomer of [Co(en)_{3}]^{3+}. One of the three C_{2} symmetry axes is shown in red.

=== Octahedral complexes ===
Ethylenediamine forms many homoleptic octahedral complexes of the formula [M(en)_{3}]^{n+}. Representative octahedral complexes are M = V^{2+}, Cr^{3+}, Mn^{3+}, Fe^{3+}, Ru^{2+}, Co^{2+} and Co^{3+}, Rh^{3+}, Ir^{3+}, Ni^{2+}, Pt^{4+} and Zn^{2+}. These complexes are chiral, and many have been resolved. Particularly famous is [Co(en)_{3}]^{3+}.

More common than homoleptic [M(en)_{3}]^{n+} complexes are "mixed ligand" derivatives, e.g., of the type [M(en)L_{4}]^{n+} and [M(en)_{2}L_{2}]^{n+}. One example is cis-dichlorobis(ethylenediamine)cobalt(III) cation.

=== Square planar complexes ===
Square planar complexes of the formula [M(en)_{2}](n^{+}) are also well known. Representative square planar complexes are M = Pd^{2+}, Pt^{2+}, Cu^{2+}, and Au^{3+}.

== Related diamine complexes ==
1,2-Propylenediamine, abbreviated pn, is chiral. It forms five-membered chelate rings analogous to en. The methyl substituent prefers the equatorial position on the MN2C2 ring. Octahedral complexes of one l-pn, i.e., [M(l^{−}pn)_{3}](n^{+}) exist as two diastereomers. One diastereomer with C3 symmetry has three methyl groups sharing one face. The other diastereomer has only C_{1} symmetry.

1,3-Propylenediamine, abbreviated tn, forms six-membered MN_{2}C_{3} chelate rings. Octahedral complexes of type [M(tn)_{3}](n^{+}) exist as two enantiomers.

Numerous 1,2-diamines are known, including trans-1,2-diaminocyclohexane and stilbenediamine. EDTA and many aminopolycarboxylates have 1,2-diamine cores. They are commercially important chelating agents.

== Reactions ==
Diamine ligands are often inert spectator ligands. One example is [Co(en)_{2}(PO_{4})].

Reactions of ethylenediamine generally involve or are initiated at the N-H bonds.

Their N-H groups are somewhat acidic as revealed by their easy exchange with D_{2}O:

[Ru(H_{2}NCH_{2}CH_{2}NH_{2})_{3}]^{3+} + 12 D_{2}O ⇌ [Ru(D_{2}NCH_{2}CH_{2}ND_{2})_{3}]^{3+} + 12 HDO

In some redox-active metals, en can undergo dehydrogenation to give diimine complexes:

[Ru(H_{2}NCH_{2}CH_{2}NH_{2})_{3}]^{2+} + O_{2} ⇌ [Ru(H_{2}NCH_{2}CH_{2}NH_{2})_{2}(HN=CHCH=NH)]^{2+} + 2 H_{2}O

Tris(ethylenediamine)cobalt(III) and some related complexes condense with mixtures of formaldehyde and ammonia to give clathrochelates :

[Co(H_{2}NCH_{2}CH_{2}NH_{2})_{3}]^{3+} + 6 CH_{2}O + 2 NH_{3} → [Co[N(CH_{2}HNCH_{2}CH_{2}NHCH_{2})_{3}N]^{3+} + 6 H_{2}O
