= Leeuwenhoekiella aequorea =

Scientific classification
- Domain: Bacteria
- Kingdom: Pseudomonadati
- Phylum: Bacteroidota
- Class: Flavobacteriia
- Order: Flavobacteriales
- Family: Flavobacteriaceae
- Genus: Leeuwenhoekiella
- Species: L. aequorea

Binomial name
- Leeuwenhoekiella aequorea Nedashkovskaya et al. 2005

Type strain
- ANT 14, CCUG 50091, CIP 108760, LMG 22550, Mergaert R-7695, R-7695, Tan ANT 14

Synonyms
- Leeuwenhoekella accommodimaris

Species of bacterium

Leeuwenhoekiella aequorea is a species of gram-negative bacterium from the genus of Leeuwenhoekiella.
