= Mercurial diuretic =

Class of chemical compounds

The structure of mersalyl acid

Mercurial diuretics are a form of renal diuretic containing mercury.

Although previously widely used, they have largely been superseded by safer diuretics such as thiazides, and are now rarely used.

== History and mechanism ==
Inorganic mercury compounds, such as mercury(I)chloride (calomel), were found to have diuretic properties when they were used to treat syphilis. Proposed use of these compounds date back at least to the 16th century, shortly after the beginning of the syphilis epidemic in 1497 following Columbus' return to Europe.

Mercurial diuretics cause diuresis by reducing the reabsorption of sodium in the ascending loop of Henle, thus causing more water being delivered to the distal convoluted tubule. Unfortunately, earlier physicians misconstrued hallmark symptoms of mercury poisoning such as excessive salivation as signs of mercury's efficacy until the early 1960s, when the use of mercurial diuretics was halted in medicine.

== Side effects ==
Due to the idiosyncratic nature of mercury toxicity, the risk of severe disease and sudden death are unpredictable and frequently show no warning signs. Physicians during the 20th century believed that a fever/rash complex suggested the risk of severe side effects for the next upcoming doses if treatment was not halted. Warkany and Hubbard noted in their seminal 1953 paper establishing mercury as the cause of infantile acrodynia that "... in modern times the capricious behavior of mercurial diuretics has been rather disturbing to those who use them frequently. Thousands of injections are given without untoward effects but occasionally a therapeutic dose results in sudden death. Only rarely is this caused by the first dose. More often the patient tolerates several—in one case 164—doses before the fatal reaction occurs. The mechanism of these reactions is not clear: they can neither be explained nor predicted; yet they cannot be denied."

After finding associations between mercurial diuretics and "mercurial" nephrotic syndrome, in addition to the sharp decline in infantile acrodynia cases after the late 1950s following the removal of many sources of childhood mercury exposure, the dangers of mercurial diuretics were realized. This led to the discontinuation of mercurial diuretics in favor of far less toxic and far more effective diuretics. This is similar to the fashion in which penicillin quickly replaced arsenic and mercury as the main antibiotic used in the treatment of syphilis for both children and adults.

== Examples ==
Some common organic mercurials:

- Chlormerodrin
- Merbaphen (Novasurol)
- Mersalyl acid (Mersal, Salyrgan)
- Meralluride
- Mercaptomerin
- Mercurophylline
- Merethoxylline procaine

== See also ==
- Mercury poisoning
