= Leeuwenhoekiella aestuarii =

Scientific classification
- Domain: Bacteria
- Kingdom: Pseudomonadati
- Phylum: Bacteroidota
- Class: Flavobacteriia
- Order: Flavobacteriales
- Family: Flavobacteriaceae
- Genus: Leeuwenhoekiella
- Species: L. aestuarii

Binomial name
- Leeuwenhoekiella aestuarii Tahon et al. 2020

Type strain
- LMG 30908

Species of bacterium

Leeuwenhoekiella aestuarii is a Gram-negative, aerobic and rod-shaped bacterium from the genus of Leeuwenhoekiella. Leeuwenhoekiella aestuarii is catalase and oxidase positive. The species is able to grow across a wide range of temperatures (4-41 °C), with an optimum growth temperature of 20-30 °C.
