= Chloropyramine =

Chemical compound

Clinical data
- AHFS/Drugs.com: International Drug Names
- Pregnancy category: C
- Routes of administration: By mouth, intramuscular, topical
- Drug class: First-generation antihistamine
- ATC code: D04AA09 (WHO) R06AC03 (WHO)

Legal status
- Legal status: By mouth: OTC, Injection: Rx-only (RU)

Pharmacokinetic data
- Bioavailability: ~100%
- Metabolism: Extensive hepatic
- Onset of action: 15–30 min (oral)
- Elimination half-life: ~14 hours
- Excretion: Kidney

Identifiers
- IUPAC name: N'-[(4-chlorophenyl)methyl]-N,N-dimethyl-N'-pyridin-2-ylethane-1,2-diamine
- CAS Number: 59-32-5
- PubChem CID: 25295
- DrugBank: DB08800
- ChemSpider: 23628
- UNII: 2K3L8O9SOV
- KEGG: D07195
- ChEMBL: ChEMBL1194287
- CompTox Dashboard (EPA): DTXSID50207729
- ECHA InfoCard: 100.000.383

Chemical and physical data
- Formula: C_{16}H_{20}ClN_{3}
- Molar mass: 289.81 g·mol^{−1}
- 3D model (JSmol): Interactive image
- SMILES: Clc1ccc(cc1)CN(c2ncccc2)CCN(C)C
- InChI: InChI=1S/C16H20ClN3/c1-19(2)11-12-20(16-5-3-4-10-18-16)13-14-6-8-15(17)9-7-14/h3-10H,11-13H2,1-2H3; Key:ICKFFNBDFNZJSX-UHFFFAOYSA-N

Chloropyramine is a first-generation antihistamine drug approved in several Eastern European countries such as Russia for the treatment of allergic conjunctivitis, allergic rhinitis, bronchial asthma, and other atopic (allergic) conditions. Related indications for clinical use include angioedema, allergic reactions to insect bites, food and drug allergies, and anaphylactic shock.

Chloropyramine is known as a competitive reversible H_{1} receptor antagonist (also known as an H_{1} inverse agonist), meaning that it exerts its pharmacological action by competing with histamine for the H_{1} subtype histamine receptor. By blocking the effects of histamine, the drug inhibits the vasodilation, increased vascular permeability, and tissue edema associated with histamine release in the tissue. The H_{1} antagonistic properties of chloropyramine can be used by researchers for the purposes of blocking the effects of histamine on cells and tissues. In addition, chloropyramine has some anticholinergic properties.

Chloropyramine's anticholinergic properties and the fact that it can pass through the blood–brain barrier are linked to its clinical side effects such as drowsiness, weakness, vertigo, fatigue, dry mouth, constipation, and rarely — visual disturbances and increase of intraocular pressure.

== Contraindications ==
Contraindications for parenteral or oral administration include benign prostatic hyperplasia, peptic ulcer, pyloric and duodenal stenosis, uncontrolled glaucoma, pregnancy and breast-feeding. It is not intended for the management of acute bronchospasm. It should be used with caution in patients with hyperthyroidism, cardiovascular diseases, and asthma.

== Adverse effects ==
In children, it can induce agitation, and in many adult patients, dizziness may be observed. Because of the pronounced sedative effect, the preparation should be prescribed cautiously in drivers and people working with machines.

A large study on people 65 years old or older linked the development of Alzheimer's disease and other forms of dementia to the "higher cumulative" use of first-generation antihistamines, due to their anticholinergic properties.

== Interactions ==
Chloropyramine should not be used internally with MAO inhibitors. Because of its anticholinergic activity, concurrent administration with cholinomimetics is not advisable. Chloropyramine should also not be used internally with alcohol, sedatives, and hypnotics because of the potentiation of the effects. General anesthetics, opioids, and other depressants potentiate the sedative effect of chloropyramine.

== Dosage ==
In cases of severe allergic reactions, chloropyramine can be injected intramuscularly or intravenously. Oral administration: In adults, 25 mg can be taken 3 to 4 times daily (up to 150 mg); in children over 5 years old, 25 mg can be taken 2 to 3 times daily. For external application, the skin or the eye conjunctiva can be treated up to several times a day by applying a thin layer of cream or ointment containing 1% chloropyramine hydrochloride.

== Trade names ==
- Allergopress, Chimpharm AD (KZ)
- Allergosan, Sopharma AD (BG, GE, LV)
- Suprastin, Egis Pharmaceuticals PLC (GE, HU, KZ, LT, LV, UA, RU)
- Supralgon, Biopharm JSC (GE)
- Supranorm-Tsiteli A, Rompharm Co. (GE)
- Synopen, Pliva d.o.o. (BA, HR, RS, MK)

== Synthesis ==
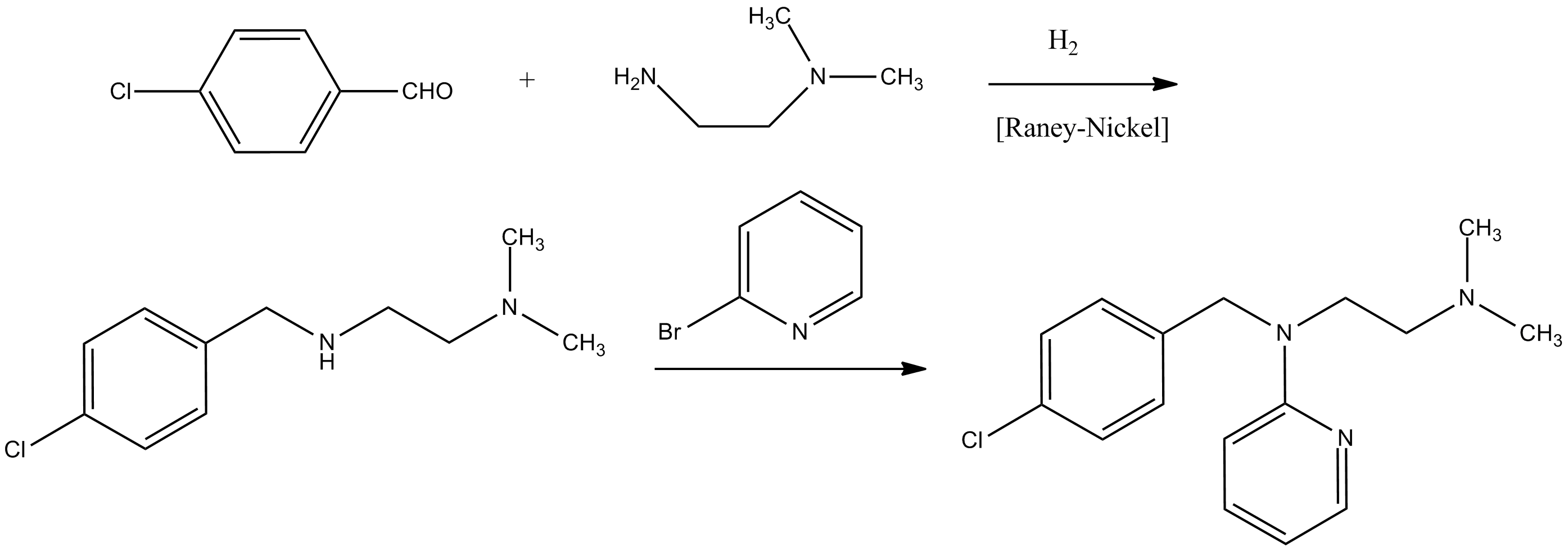
Chloropyramine synthesis:

The preparation begins with the condensation of 4-chlorobenzaldehyde with 1,1-dimethyethylenediamine. The resulting Schiff base is reduced. The resulting amine is then further reacts with 2-bromopyridine in the presence of sodamide.

Chloropyramine synthesis 2: U.S. patent 2,607,778

Chloropyramine synthesis 3: GB 651596

== See also ==
- Mepyramine (4-methoxy analog)
- Methapyrilene
- Chlorothen
