= 2,3-Butanediamine =

Names
- Preferred IUPAC name Butane-2,3-diamine
- Other names 1,2-Dimethylethylenediamine; 2,3-Diaminobutane

Identifiers
CAS Number	563-86-0; (R,S): 948906-21-6; (R,R): 52165-57-8; (S,S): 52165-56-7; rel-(R,S): 20759-15-3; (±): 20699-48-3
3D model (JSmol)	Interactive image; (S,S): Interactive image; rel-(R,S): Interactive image
ChemSpider	rel-(R,S): 18500663
PubChem CID	136362; (S,S): 7021489
UNII	(S,S): 3V33XP143Y; (±): L55K56E9N0
CompTox Dashboard (EPA)	DTXSID00903769
- InChI: InChI=1S/C4H12N2/c1-3(5)4(2)6/h3-4H,5-6H2,1-2H3 Key: GHWVXCQZPNWFRO-UHFFFAOYSA-N; (S,S): InChI=1S/C4H12N2/c1-3(5)4(2)6/h3-4H,5-6H2,1-2H3/t3-,4-/m0/s1 Key: GHWVXCQZPNWFRO-IMJSIDKUSA-N; rel-(R,S): InChI=1S/C4H12N2/c1-3(5)4(2)6/h3-4H,5-6H2,1-2H3/t3-,4+ Key: GHWVXCQZPNWFRO-ZXZARUISSA-N
- SMILES: NC(C)C(N)C; (S,S): C[C@@H]([C@H](C)N)N; rel-(R,S): C[C@H]([C@H](C)N)N

Properties
Chemical formula	C_{4}H_{12}N_{2}
Molar mass	88.154 g·mol^{−1}
Appearance	colorless oil
Boiling point	44-45 °C (25 mmHg, rac); 46-48 °C (25 mmHg, meso); 55.3-59.3 °C (60 mmHg, DL-threo); 56.1-60.5 °C (60 mmHg, meso)
- Except where otherwise noted, data are given for materials in their standard state (at 25 °C [77 °F], 100 kPa). Infobox references

2,3-Butanediamine are organic compounds with the formula CH_{3}CH(NH_{2})CH(NH_{2})CH_{3}. Three stereoisomers exist, meso and a pair of enantiomers. These diamines form complexes with transition metals.

== Synthesis ==
2,3-Butanediamines can be prepared by hydrolyzing 2-ethoxy-4,5-dihydro-4,5-dimethylimidazole with barium hydroxide. Alternative, it is produced by reduction of dimethylglyoxime with lithium aluminium hydride. The meso and the d,l diastereomers can be separated by fractional crystallization of the hydrochlorides. The enantiomers have been resolved using tartrate salts.

== Reactions ==
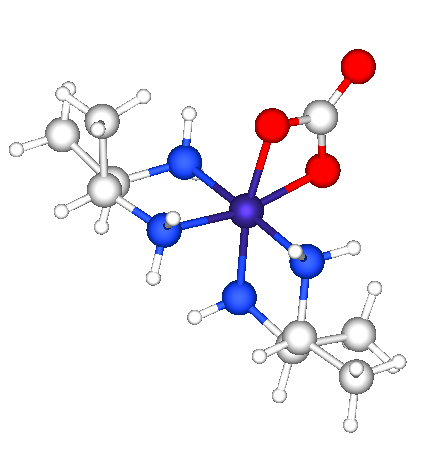
Structure of the cation [Co(meso-bn)_{2}CO_{3}]^{+} as determined by X-ray crystallography. Color code: red = N, blue = N.

In coordination chemistry, 2,3-butanediamine (abbreviated bn) has illuminates aspects of the stereochemistry. The structure of [Co(meso-2,3-butanediamine)_{2}CO_{3}]^{+} confirms the presence of the rarely observed axial methyl groups on each of the diamine-cobalt rings.

== Related compounds ==
- 1,2-Diaminopropane, chiral 1,2-diamine
- 1,2-Diaminocyclohexane, a 1,2-diamine that also exists as three stereoisomers
