= PPM1F =

Protein-coding gene in the species Homo sapiens

Identifiers
- Aliases: PPM1F, CAMKP, CaMKPase, FEM-2, POPX2, hFEM-2, protein phosphatase, Mg2+/Mn2+ dependent 1F
- External IDs: MGI: 1918464; GeneCards: PPM1F
Enzyme activity
EC #	BRENDA	ExPASy	KEGG	MetaCyc
3.1.3.16	↗	↗	↗	↗

Gene location (Human)
Chr.	Chromosome 22 (human)
Band	22q11.22	Start	21,919,425 bp
Band	22q11.22	End	21,952,848 bp

Gene location (Mouse)
Chr.	Chromosome 16 (mouse)
Band	16|16 A3	Start	16,714,333 bp
Band	16|16 A3	End	16,745,228 bp
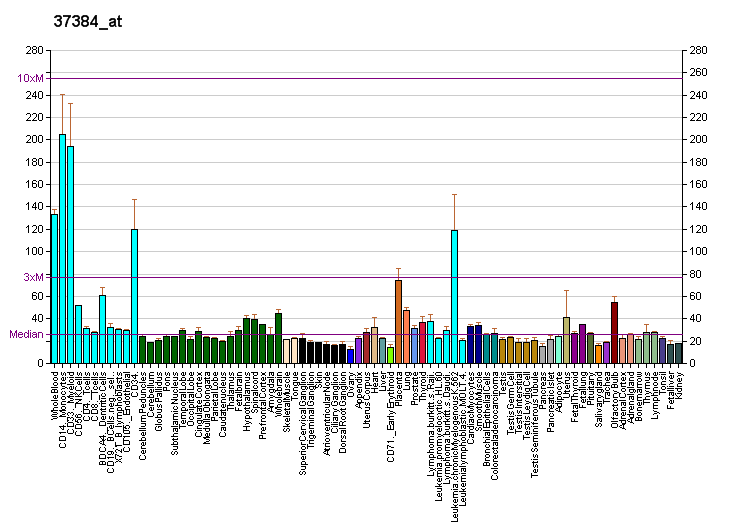

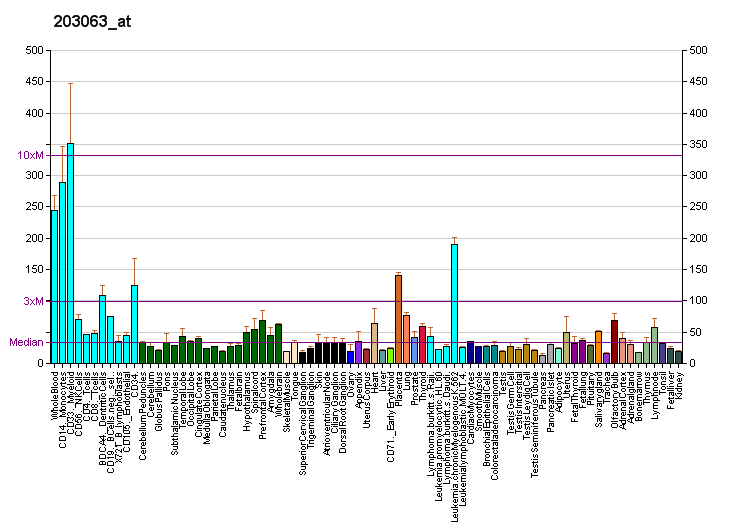
RNA expression pattern
Bgee	Human / Mouse (ortholog); Top expressed in: monocyte; sural nerve; granulocyte; blood; endothelial cell; periodontal fiber; spleen; right lung; tendon of biceps brachii; apex of heart / Top expressed in: otic vesicle; hand; Epithelium of choroid plexus; dentate gyrus of hippocampal formation granule cell; central gray substance of midbrain; right lung lobe; carotid body; otolith organ; lens; utricle; More reference expression data
BioGPS	More reference expression data
Gene ontology
Molecular function	phosphoprotein phosphatase activity; calmodulin-dependent protein phosphatase activity; metal ion binding; protein binding; catalytic activity; cation binding; hydrolase activity; protein serine/threonine phosphatase activity; protein tyrosine/serine/threonine phosphatase activity
Cellular component	perinuclear region of cytoplasm; cytosol; protein-containing complex
Biological process	apoptotic process; peptidyl-threonine dephosphorylation; negative regulation of protein kinase activity; protein dephosphorylation; positive regulation of epithelial cell migration; positive regulation of growth; intrinsic apoptotic signaling pathway; positive regulation of gene expression; positive regulation of chemotaxis; negative regulation of protein kinase activity by regulation of protein phosphorylation; negative regulation of peptidyl-serine phosphorylation; positive regulation of focal adhesion assembly; negative regulation of transcription, DNA-templated; positive regulation of stress fiber assembly; positive regulation of cell-substrate adhesion; positive regulation of cysteine-type endopeptidase activity involved in apoptotic process; positive regulation of cell migration; negative regulation of protein transport; peptidyl-serine dephosphorylation; negative regulation of cell-cell adhesion mediated by cadherin
Sources:Amigo / QuickGO
Orthologs
Databases	NCBI: entry; OMA: entry
Species	Human	Mouse
Entrez	9647	68606
Ensembl	ENSG00000100034	ENSMUSG00000026181
UniProt	P49593	Q8CGA0
RefSeq (mRNA)	NM_014634	NM_176833
RefSeq (protein)	NP_055449	NP_789803
Location (UCSC)	Chr 22: 21.92 – 21.95 Mb	Chr 16: 16.71 – 16.75 Mb
PubMed search
- Wikidata
View/Edit Human	View/Edit Mouse

Protein phosphatase 1F is an enzyme that in humans is encoded by the PPM1F gene.

The protein encoded by this gene is a member of the PP2C family of Ser/Thr protein phosphatases. PP2C family members are known to be negative regulators of cell stress response pathways. This phosphatase can interact with Rho guanine nucleotide exchange factors (PIX), and thus block the effects of p21-activated kinase 1 (PAK), a protein kinase mediating biological effects downstream of Rho GTPases. Calcium/calmodulin-dependent protein kinase II gamma (CAMK2G/CAMK-II) is found to be one of the substrates of this phosphatase. The overexpression of this phosphatase or CAMK2G has been shown to mediate caspase-dependent apoptosis. An alternatively spliced transcript variant has been identified, but its full-length nature has not been determined.
