= Methanediamine =

Names
- Other names Diaminomethane; Methylenediamine

Identifiers
CAS Number	2372-88-5; hydrochloride: 57166-92-4
3D model (JSmol)	Interactive image; hydrochloride: Interactive image
Beilstein Reference	1696889
ChEBI	CHEBI:35413
ChEMBL	ChEMBL4647969
ChemSpider	67941; hydrochloride: 149983
EC Number	hydrochloride: 260-602-6
Gmelin Reference	163933
PubChem CID	75408; hydrochloride: 171572
UNII	9E12MBV9NE; hydrochloride: WZB0836N6G
CompTox Dashboard (EPA)	DTXSID6043755
- InChI: InChI=1S/CH6N2/c2-1-3/h1-3H2 Key: RTWNYYOXLSILQN-UHFFFAOYSA-N; hydrochloride: InChI=1S/CH6N2.2ClH/c2-1-3;;/h1-3H2;2*1H Key: QCYJCJJCNRIMNG-UHFFFAOYSA-N
- SMILES: NCN; hydrochloride: C(N)N.Cl.Cl

Properties
Chemical formula	CH_{6}N_{2}
Molar mass	46.073 g·mol^{−1}
Dipole moment	1.72 D

Related compounds
Related compounds	methylamine ethylenediamine aminomethanol methanediol
- Except where otherwise noted, data are given for materials in their standard state (at 25 °C [77 °F], 100 kPa). Infobox references

Methanediamine is the simplest geminal diamine. Its chemical formula is CH_{2}(NH_{2})_{2}, and its structure consists of two amino groups on a central carbon atom. Although methanediamine only exists transiently in solution, its hydrochloride salt has been used in chemical synthesis since 1914. The hydrochloride is useful for the synthesis of primary amides from amino acids.

== Possible relevance to primordial chemistry ==
Methylamine and ammonia will react to form methanediamine when exposed under energetic electrons, just like conditions similar to cold molecular clouds. Since methanediamine is the simplest molecule to contain the N-C-N moiety, it could be a vital intermediate in the abiogenesis of heterocyclic compounds that contain the N-C-N moiety, such as nucleobases.
