= Oxidase test =

Microbiological and biochemical method for identification

The oxidase test is used to determine whether an organism possesses the cytochrome c oxidase enzyme. The test is used as an aid for the differentiation of Neisseria, Moraxella, Campylobacter and Pasteurella species (oxidase positive). It is also used to differentiate pseudomonads from related species.

== Classification ==
Strains may be either oxidase-positive (OX+) or oxidase-negative (OX-).

=== OX+ ===
OX+ normally means the bacterium contains cytochrome c oxidase (also known as Complex IV) and can therefore use oxygen for energy production by converting O_{2} to H_{2}O_{2} or H_{2}O with an electron transfer chain.

The Pseudomonadaceae are typically OX+.

The Gram-negative diplococci Neisseria and Moraxella are oxidase-positive.

Many Gram-negative, spiral curved rods are also oxidase-positive, which includes Helicobacter pylori, Vibrio cholerae, and Campylobacter jejuni.

=== Oxidase variable ===
Legionella pneumophila may be oxidase-positive.

=== OX− ===
OX− normally means the bacterium does not contain cytochrome c oxidase and, therefore, either cannot use oxygen for energy production with an electron transfer chain or employs a different cytochrome for transferring electrons to oxygen.

Enterobacteriaceae are typically OX−.

== Mechanism ==
TMPD

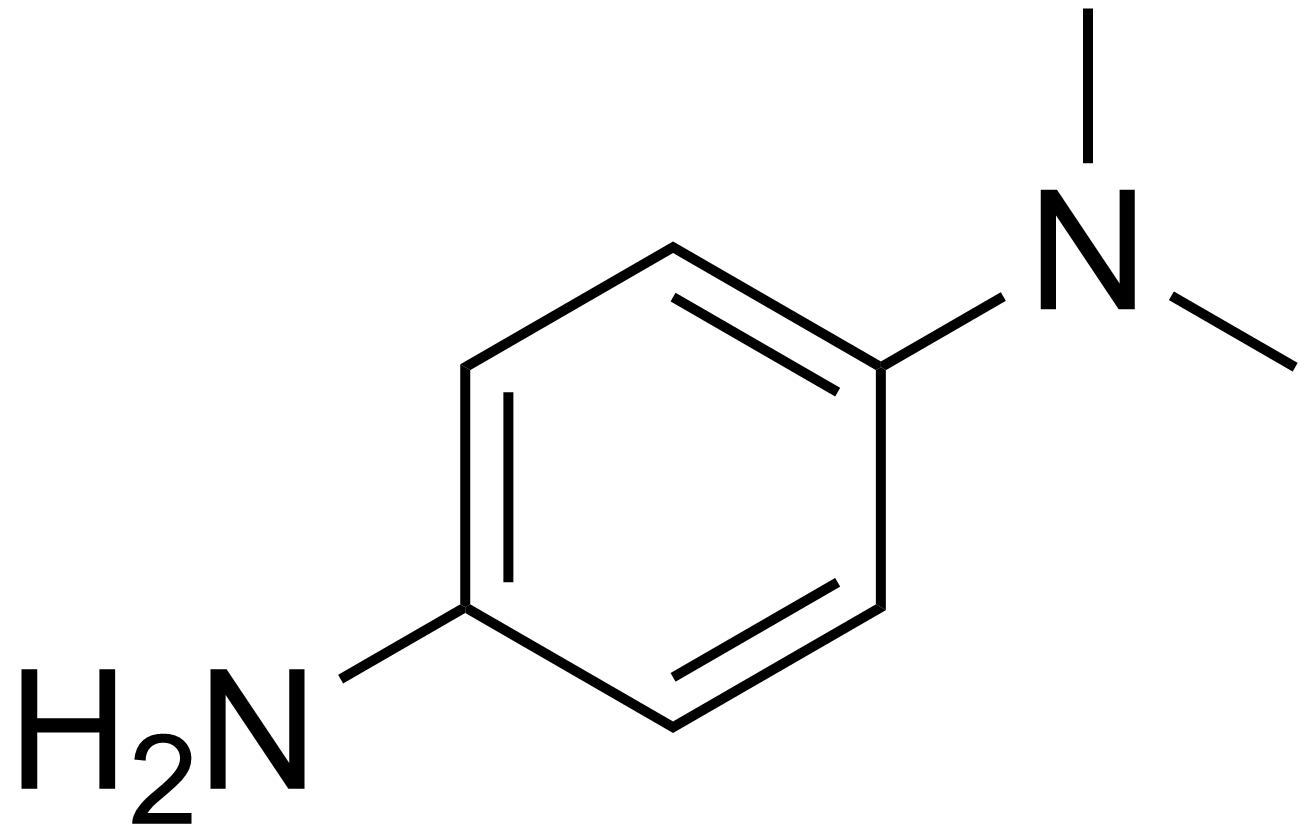
DMPD

The test uses disks impregnated with reagents such as N,N,N′,N′-tetramethyl-p-phenylenediamine, TMPD (or N,N-dimethyl-p-phenylenediamine, DMPD, which is another redox indicator). The reagent is a dark-blue to maroon color when oxidized, and colorless when reduced. Oxidase-positive bacteria possess cytochrome oxidase or indophenol oxidase (an iron-containing hemoprotein). These both catalyze the transport of electrons from donor compounds (NADH) to electron acceptors (usually oxygen). The test reagent TMPD acts as an artificial electron donor for the enzyme oxidase. The oxidized reagent forms the colored compound indophenol blue. The cytochrome system is usually only present in aerobic organisms that are capable of using oxygen as the terminal electron acceptor. The end-product of this metabolism is either water or hydrogen peroxide (broken down by catalase).

=== Procedures ===
1. Wet each disk with about four inoculating loops of deionized water.
2. Use a loop to aseptically transfer a large mass of pure bacteria to the disk.
3. Observe the disk for up to three minutes. If the area of inoculation turns dark-blue to maroon to almost black, then the result is positive. If a color change does not occur within three minutes, the result is negative.

In alternative manner, live bacteria cultivated on trypticase soy agar plates may be prepared using sterile technique with a single-line streak inoculation. The inoculated plates are incubated at 37 °C for 24–48 hours to establish colonies. Fresh bacterial preparations should be used. After colonies have grown on the medium, 2-3 drops of the reagent DMPD are added to the surface of each organism to be tested.

- A positive test (OX+) will result in a color change violet to purple, within 10–30 seconds.
- A negative test (OX-) will result in a light-pink or absence of coloration.
