= Chlormerodrin =

Names
- IUPAC name 3-carbamoylamino-2-methoxypropylmercury(II) chloride
- Systematic IUPAC name 3-chloro-mercura-2-methoxy propylurea
- Other names: Chloromeridin; Chlormerodin; Chlormerodrine; Chlormeroprin; Diurone; Katonil; Mercardox; Mercloran; Mercoral; Merculest; Merilid; Neogidrin; Neohydrin; Oricur; Percapyl; Promeran; Promerane; 3-chloro-mercuri-2-methoxy propylurea; [3-(Carbamoylamino)-2-methoxypropyl](chloro)mercury

Identifiers
CAS Number	62-37-3
3D model (JSmol)	Interactive image
ECHA InfoCard	100.000.483
PubChem CID	25210
UNII	99T5TWO621
- SMILES: COC(CNC(N)=O)C[Hg]Cl

Properties
Chemical formula	C_{5}H_{11}ClHgN_{2}O_{2}
Molar mass	367.20 g·mol^{−1}
Appearance	Solid
Melting point	152.5 °C (306.5 °F; 425.6 K)
Solubility in water	11 g/L

Hazards
- Occupational safety and health (OHS/OSH)
Main hazards	Renal mercury poisoning
- Except where otherwise noted, data are given for materials in their standard state (at 25 °C [77 °F], 100 kPa). Infobox references

Chlormerodrin

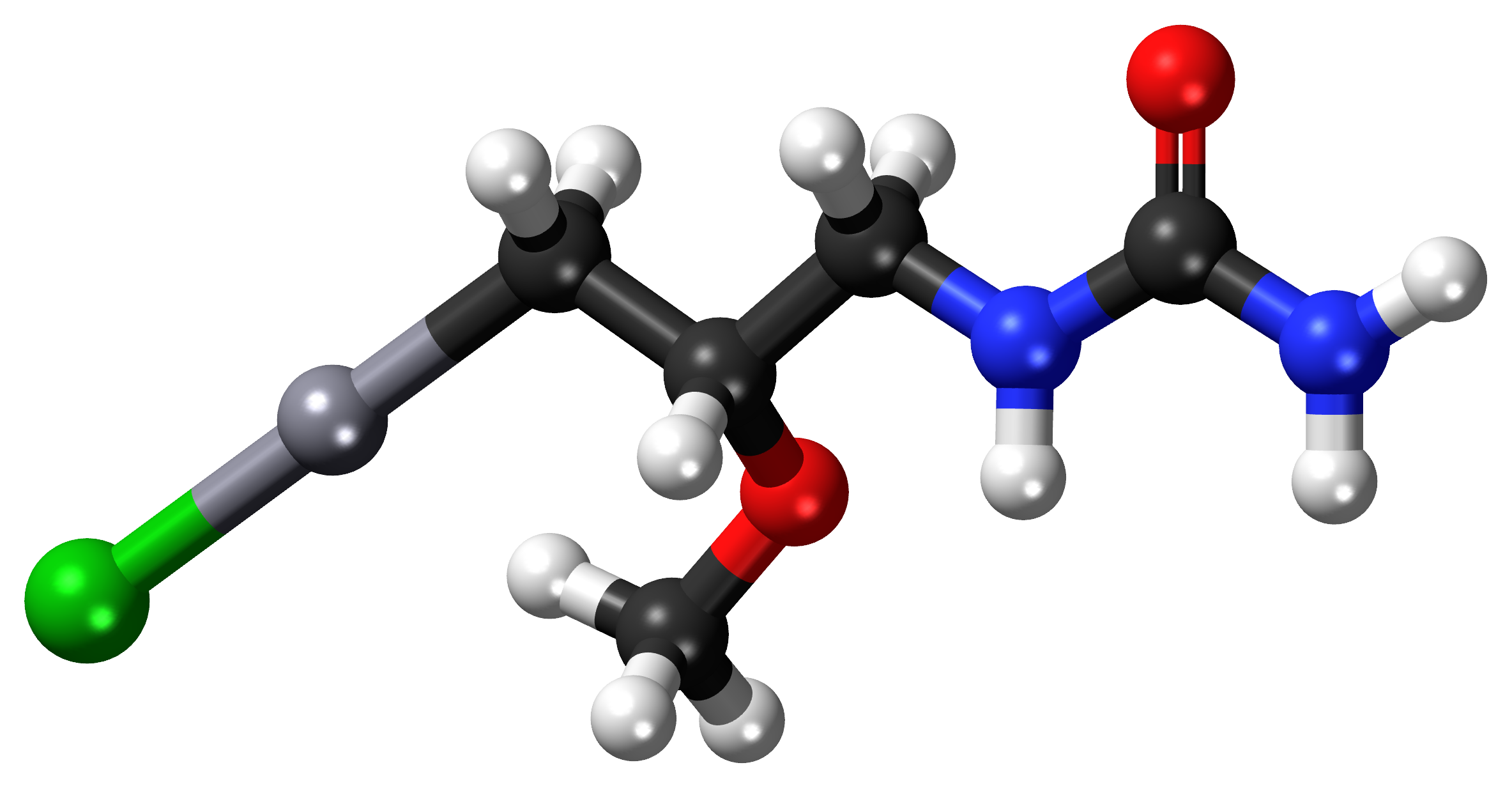

Clinical data
- AHFS/Drugs.com: Medical Encyclopedia
- ATC code: none

Legal status
- Legal status: US: Withdrawn

Identifiers
- IUPAC name: 3-carbamoylamino-2-methoxypropylmercury(II) chloride
- CAS Number: 62-37-3
- PubChem CID: 25210
- DrugBank: DB00534
- ChemSpider: 2615
- UNII: 99T5TWO621
- ChEBI: CHEBI:59445
- ChEMBL: ChEMBL2110562
- ECHA InfoCard: 100.000.483

Chemical and physical data
- Formula: C_{5}H_{11}ClHgN_{2}O_{2}
- Molar mass: 367.20 g·mol^{−1}
- 3D model (JSmol): Interactive image
- SMILES: COC(CNC(=O)N)C[Hg]Cl
- InChI: InChI=1S/C5H11N2O2.ClH.Hg/c1-4(9-2)3-7-5(6)8;;/h4H,1,3H2,2H3,(H3,6,7,8);1H;/q;;+1/p-1; Key:BJFGVYCULWBXKF-UHFFFAOYSA-M

Chlormerodrin is a mercurial diuretic commercially traded from 1952 until 1974 that was once used to treat patients with heart failure, but is no longer in widespread use. The radiolabelled form (^{197}Hg & ^{203}Hg) had also been used for medical imaging of the kidney and brain and the ^{197}Hg form was even considered a contender for ^{99m}Tc by some physicians, but was ultimately discontinued by the FDA in 1989.
