= Chlormidazole =

Chemical compound

Clinical data
- AHFS/Drugs.com: International Drug Names
- ATC code: D01AC04 (WHO)

Identifiers
- IUPAC name: 1-[(4-chlorophenyl)methyl]-2-methylbenzimidazole
- CAS Number: 3689-76-7
- PubChem CID: 71821
- ChemSpider: 64845
- UNII: 8IKK64FJVX
- KEGG: D02557
- ChEMBL: ChEMBL152649
- CompTox Dashboard (EPA): DTXSID5046140
- ECHA InfoCard: 100.020.908

Chemical and physical data
- Formula: C_{15}H_{13}ClN_{2}
- Molar mass: 256.73 g·mol^{−1}
- 3D model (JSmol): Interactive image
- SMILES: Clc1ccc(cc1)Cn2c3ccccc3nc2C

Chlormidazole (INN, also known as clomidazole) is used as a spasmolytic and azole antifungal drug.

== Synthesis ==
Chlormidazole synthesis: Herrling et al., U.S. patent 2,876,233 (1959 to Grünenthal).

== See also ==
- Clemizole
