= Tert-Butylmagnesium chloride =

tert-Butylmagnesium chloride

Identifiers
CAS Number	677-22-5
3D model (JSmol)	Interactive image
ChemSpider	21170922
ECHA InfoCard	100.010.581
EC Number	211-638-6
PubChem CID	2724198
CompTox Dashboard (EPA)	DTXSID00987044
- InChI: InChI=1S/C4H9.ClH.Mg/c1-4(2)3;;/h1-3H3;1H;/q-1;;+2/p-1 Key: CQRPUKWAZPZXTO-UHFFFAOYSA-M
- SMILES: C[C-](C)C.[Mg+2].[Cl-]

Properties
Chemical formula	C_{4}H_{9}ClMg
Molar mass	116.87 g·mol^{−1}

Hazards
- GHS labelling
Pictograms	(GHS02: Flammable) (GHS05: Corrosive)
Signal word	Danger
Hazard statements	H225, H250, H260, H314
Precautionary statements	P210, P222, P223, P231, P231+P232, P233, P240, P241, P242, P243, P260, P264, P280, P301+P330+P331, P302+P335+P334, P302+P361+P354, P303+P361+P353, P304+P340, P305+P354+P338, P316, P321, P363, P370+P378, P402+P404, P403+P235, P405, P501
- Except where otherwise noted, data are given for materials in their standard state (at 25 °C [77 °F], 100 kPa). Infobox references

tert-butylmagnesium chloride is an organometallic compound belonging to the group of Grignard reagents.

== Synthesis ==
tert-Butylmagnesium chloride can be synthesized by reacting 2-chloro-2-methylpropane with magnesium in diethyl ether.

== Reactions and uses ==
tert-Butylmagnesium chloride reacts with nitriles, with improved yields obtained by adding copper(I) bromide. It has also been used to prepare sulfoxides bearing a butyl group from thionyl chloride.

Reaction of tert-butylmagnesium chloride with phosphorus trichloride yields chloro-di-tert-butylphosphine. The addition of 10 mol% copper(I) iodide and 20 mol% lithium bromide enables the introduction of a third butyl group, yielding tri-tert-butylphosphine.

Reaction with carbon dioxide yields pivalic acid. tert-Butylmagnesium chloride can also be used to synthesize tetramethylbutane. For this purpose, it is reacted in diethyl ether with a mixture of 2-chloro-2-methylpropane and 2-iodo-2-methylpropane in an 11:1 ratio in the presence of copper(I) iodide. It has also been used to introduce a tert-butyl group during the synthesis of buprenorphine. Furthermore, it is suitable as an initiator for the polymerization of vinyl chloride in tetrahydrofuran.

== Deuterated tert-butylmagnesium chloride ==
The deuterated compound tert-butylmagnesium chloride (tert-butylmagnesium chloride-d_{9}) can be prepared by reacting tert-butyl chloride-d_{9} with magnesium in tetrahydrofuran.

Reaction of tert-butylmagnesium chloride-d_{9} with phosphorus trichloride yields tri-tert-butylphosphine-d_{27}.
