= N,N-Dimethylphenylenediamine =

Names
- Preferred IUPAC name N^{1},N^{1}-Dimethylbenzene-1,4-diamine
- Other names p-Aminodimethylaniline; N,N-Dimethyl-p-phenylenediamine; 4-(Dimethylamino)aniline; p-Amino-N,N-dimethylaniline; p-(Dimethylamino)aniline; DMPPDA; Dimethyl-p-phenylenediamine; 4-Amino-N,N-dimethylaniline; p-Dimethylaminophenylamine; DMPD

Identifiers
CAS Number	99-98-9
3D model (JSmol)	Interactive image
ChEBI	CHEBI:15783
ChEMBL	ChEMBL36296
ChemSpider	13884246
ECHA InfoCard	100.002.552
EC Number	202-807-5
KEGG	C04203
PubChem CID	7472
UNII	7GZH2FMK7X
UN number	2811 (DIMETHYL-P-PHENYLENEDIAMINE)
CompTox Dashboard (EPA)	DTXSID6025149
- InChI: InChI=1S/C8H12N2/c1-10(2)8-5-3-7(9)4-6-8/h3-6H,9H2,1-2H3 Key: BZORFPDSXLZWJF-UHFFFAOYSA-N
- SMILES: CN(C)C1=CC=C(C=C1)N

Properties
Chemical formula	C_{8}H_{12}N_{2}
Molar mass	136.198 g·mol^{−1}
Appearance	colorless solid
Density	1.036 g/cm³
Melting point	53 °C (127 °F; 326 K)
Boiling point	262 °C (504 °F; 535 K)

Hazards
- GHS labelling
Pictograms	(GHS06: Toxic)
Signal word	Danger
Hazard statements	H301, H311, H331
Precautionary statements	P261, P262, P264, P270, P271, P280, P301+P316, P302+P352, P304+P340, P316, P321, P330, P361+P364, P403+P233, P405, P501
- Except where otherwise noted, data are given for materials in their standard state (at 25 °C [77 °F], 100 kPa). verify (what is ?) Infobox references

N,N-Dimethylphenylenediamine (dimethyl-4-phenylenediamine) is an organic compound with the formula H_{2}NC_{6}H_{4}N(CH_{3})_{2}. It is one of the phenylenediamines, a class of compounds that have long attracted attention for their redox properties. This diamine is, for example, easily oxidized to a deep red radical cation, [H_{2}NC_{6}H_{4}N(CH_{3})_{2}]^{+} which is called Wurster's Red. The related Wurster's Blue cation has four N-methyl groups (CH_{3})_{2}NC_{6}H_{4}N(CH_{3})^{+}_{2}

Structure of Wurster's Red bromide with bond distances in picometers

== Synthesis ==
Dimethyl-4-phenylenediamine is prepared by the nitration of dimethylaniline followed by reduction of the resulting 4-nitrodimethylaniline. A variety of methods have been examined.

== Applications ==
Dimethyl-4-phenylenediamine can be converted to methylene blue by reaction with dimethylaniline and sodium thiosulfate in several steps:

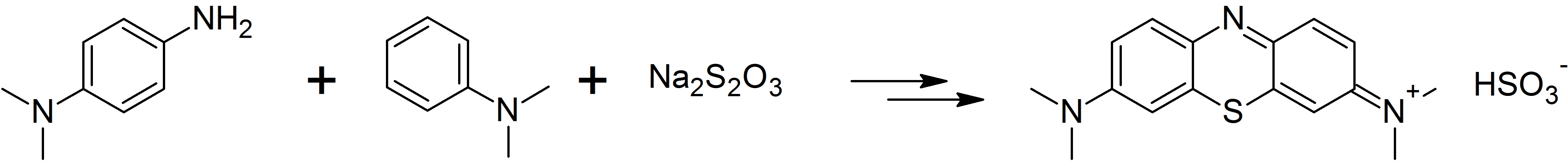

It reacts with carbon disulfide to give the corresponding mercaptobenzothiazole:

(CH_{3})_{2}NC_{6}H_{4}NH_{2} + CS_{2} + S → (CH_{3})_{2}NC_{6}H_{3}NCSH)S + H_{2}S

== History ==
Casmir Wurster discovered tetramethylphenylenediamine and its easy oxidation. Subsequent work revealed the variety of redox properties of the phenylenediamines.
