= Chlorothen =

Chemical compound

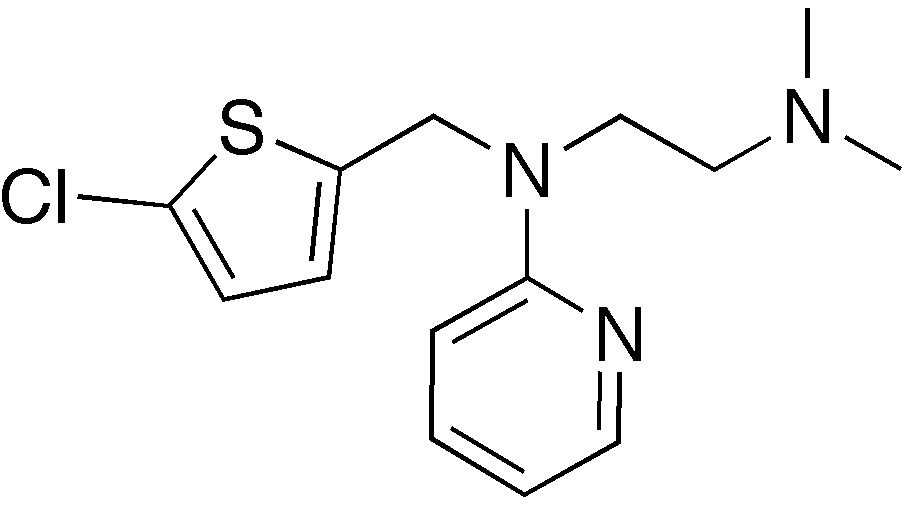

Clinical data
- Trade names: Thenclor
- Routes of administration: Oral
- ATC code: none

Identifiers
- IUPAC name: N-[(5-chloro-2-thienyl)methyl]-N',N'-dimethyl-N-(2-pyridyl)ethane-1,2-diamine
- CAS Number: 148-65-2
- PubChem CID: 8993
- ChemSpider: 8645
- UNII: Y6068K376I
- ChEMBL: ChEMBL2110628
- CompTox Dashboard (EPA): DTXSID5074848

Chemical and physical data
- Formula: C_{14}H_{18}ClN_{3}S
- Molar mass: 295.83 g·mol^{−1}
- 3D model (JSmol): Interactive image
- SMILES: Clc1sc(cc1)CN(c2ncccc2)CCN(C)C
- InChI: InChI=InChI=1S/C14H18ClN3S/c1-17(2)9-10-18(14-5-3-4-8-16-14)11-12-6-7-13(15)19-12/h3-8H,9-11H2,1-2H3; Key:XAEXSWVTEJHRMH-UHFFFAOYSA-N

Chlorothen (trade name Thenclor) is an antihistamine and anticholinergic.
