= Tetramethylphenylenediamine =

Names
- Preferred IUPAC name N^{1},N^{1},N^{4},N^{4}-Tetramethylbenzene-1,4-diamine
- Other names: N,N,N′,N′-Tetramethyl-1,4-phenylenediamine; TMPD; Wurster's reagent; TL-85, also known as TMPD 1,4-Bis(dimethylamino)benzene

Identifiers
CAS Number	100-22-1
3D model (JSmol)	Interactive image
Abbreviations	TMPD
ChEMBL	ChEMBL1393325
ChemSpider	21106585
ECHA InfoCard	100.002.574
EC Number	202-831-6
PubChem CID	7490
UNII	P4P3AC32ZB
CompTox Dashboard (EPA)	DTXSID5026124
- InChI: InChI=1S/C10H16N2/c1-11(2)9-5-7-10(8-6-9)12(3)4/h5-8H,1-4H3 Key: CJAOGUFAAWZWNI-UHFFFAOYSA-N; InChI=1/C10H16N2/c1-11(2)9-5-7-10(8-6-9)12(3)4/h5-8H,1-4H3 Key: CJAOGUFAAWZWNI-UHFFFAOYAJ
- SMILES: CN(C)c1ccc(cc1)N(C)C

Properties
Chemical formula	C_{10}H_{16}N_{2}
Molar mass	164.252 g·mol^{−1}
Appearance	Colorless solid
Density	1.08 g/cm^{3}
Melting point	51 °C (124 °F; 324 K)
Boiling point	260 °C (500 °F; 533 K)
Solubility in water	Slightly in cold water more so in hot water
Solubility in other solvents	Soluble in alcohol, chloroform
Acidity (pK_{a})	6.35

Hazards
Flash point	110 °C (230 °F; 383 K)
- Except where otherwise noted, data are given for materials in their standard state (at 25 °C [77 °F], 100 kPa). verify (what is ?) Infobox references

Tetramethylphenylenediamine (TMPD) is an organic compound with the formula C_{6}H_{4}(N(CH_{3})_{2})_{2}. It is most studied of three isomers of this formula. It is a colorless solid. With two dimethylamino substituents, the ring is particularly electron rich.

== Redox behavior ==
One-electron oxidation of TMPD gives the deep blue radical cation called Wurster's blue, C_{6}H_{4}(N(CH_{3})_{2})^{+}_{2}. It was one of the first radical cations to be reported. Many properties have been described including its rapid rate of self-exchange:

C_{6}H_{4}(N(CH_{3})_{2})_{2} + [C_{6}H_{4}(N(CH_{3})_{2})_{2}]^{+} ⇌ [C_{6}H_{4}(N(CH_{3})_{2})_{2}]^{+} + C_{6}H_{4}(N(CH_{3})_{2})_{2}

X-ray crystallography of the TMPD and its iodide salt reveals that oxidation most strongly contracts the C-N(CH_{3})_{2} and the HC---CH bonds, indicating that oxidation gives a quinoid-like species.

Structure of 1,4-Bis(dimethylamino)benzene and Its Iodide Salt
Compound	C(phenyl)-N	NC---CH	HC---CH	CH3---N
TMPD	1.408	1.40	1.38	1.46
[TMPD]^{+}I^{-}	1.344	1.422	1.36	1.454

The monocation illustrates an early step in the oxidation of p-phenylenediamine derivatives, which are widely used for hair dying. N,N-Dimethylphenylenediamine (H_{2}NC_{6}H_{4}N(CH_{3})_{2}) also easily oxidizes to a radical cation, called Wurster's Red.

The hydrochloride salt of TMPD has been used as a redox indicator in the oxidase test and is also used in electron transport chain analysis as it is capable of donating electrons to cytochrome c. The midpoint potential for titration of the first electron is given as 0.276 V vs Standard hydrogen electrode, and this transition is useful in potentiometric titrations as both a redox mediator and indicator.

== History ==
TMPD was reported in 1879 by Casmir Wurster (7 August 1854 – 29 November 1913), hence it is known as Wurster's reagent.
