= N,N'-Dimethylethylenediamine =

Names
- Preferred IUPAC name N,N′-Dimethylethane-1,2-diamine
- Other names N,N′-Dimethyl-1,2-ethanediamine

Identifiers
CAS Number	110-70-3
3D model (JSmol)	Interactive image
ChemSpider	7779
ECHA InfoCard	100.003.450
EC Number	203-793-3
PubChem CID	8070
UNII	JBC5EX42TL
CompTox Dashboard (EPA)	DTXSID4058730
- InChI: InChI=1S/C4H12N2/c1-5-3-4-6-2/h5-6H,3-4H2,1-2H3 Key: KVKFRMCSXWQSNT-UHFFFAOYSA-N
- SMILES: CNCCNC

Properties
Chemical formula	C_{4}H_{12}N_{2}
Molar mass	88.154 g·mol^{−1}
Appearance	Colorless liquid
Density	0.819 g/mL
Boiling point	120 °C (248 °F; 393 K)
- Except where otherwise noted, data are given for materials in their standard state (at 25 °C [77 °F], 100 kPa). Infobox references

N,N'-Dimethylethylenediamine (DMEDA) is the organic compound with the formula (CH_{3}NH)_{2}C_{2}H_{4}. It is a colorless liquid with a fishy odor. It features two secondary amine functional groups. Regarding its name, N and N' indicate that the methyl groups are attached to different nitrogen atoms.

== Reactions ==
DMEDA is used as a chelating diamine for the preparation of metal complexes, some of which function as homogeneous catalysts.

The compound is used as a precursor to imidazolidines by condensation with ketones or with aldehydes:

O=CRR' + C_{2}H_{4}[NH(CH_{3})]_{2} → C_{2}H_{4}[NH(CH_{3})]_{2}CRR' + H_{2}O

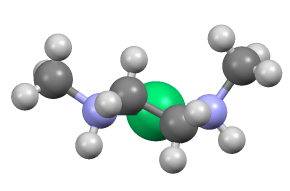
View down chelate ring-Ni axis in trans-[NiCl_{2}(DMEDA)_{2}] (one DMEDA and chloride ligands omitted for clarity). Color code: green = Ni, violet = N, dark gray = C

DMEDA complexes of copper(I) halides are used to catalyze C-N coupling reactions.

== See also ==
- 1,1-Dimethylethylenediamine
- Dimethylaminopropylamine
