= Chymopapain =

Enzyme

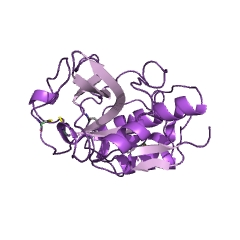
- Chymopapain's structure

Identifiers
- EC no.: 3.4.22.6
- CAS no.: 2593837

Databases
- IntEnz: IntEnz view
- BRENDA: BRENDA entry
- ExPASy: NiceZyme view
- KEGG: KEGG entry
- MetaCyc: metabolic pathway
- PRIAM: profile
- PDB structures: RCSB PDB PDBe PDBsum
Search
- PMC: articles
- PubMed: articles
- NCBI: proteins

Chymopapain (EC 3.4.22.6, chymopapain A, chymopapain B, chymopapain S, brand name Chymodiactin) is a proteolytic enzyme isolated from the latex of papaya (Carica papaya). It is a cysteine protease which belongs to the papain-like protease (PLCP) group. Because of its proteolytic activity, it is the main molecule in the process of chemonucleolysis, used in some procedures like the treatment of herniated lower lumbar discs in the spine by a nonsurgical method.

== Structure ==
=== Primary structure ===
Chymopapain's zymogen is made up of a total of 352 residues, and it has a weight of approximately 23.78kDa. Three different regions can be distinguished inside the precursor's chain.

- The first 18 aminoacids act as a sorting signal by indicating the final destination of chymopapain inside the cell when being sorted by the Golgi apparatus. Although this final destination is not fully studied yet, other PLCPs are contained in lysosomes and other acidified vesicles and chymopapain is believed to be in these same vesicles as well. Chymopapain is also known to be secreted outside the cell.
- The second region is constituted by residues 19 to 134, which conform a propeptide that will be removed upon activation once chymopapain reaches its final destination inside the cell. This region allows the protein to be properly folded in the endoplasmatic reticulum and to stabilize the chain in different acidity conditions, as its optimum pH varies from 3,5 to 10 depending on the substrate. Therefore, the ability to work in low pH conditions supports the idea that chymopapain can be found in lysosomes. The propeptide is folded in a way that prevents substrates from entering into the active site, thus blocking proteolytic activity until it is cleaved.
- The rest of the protein -residues 135 to 352- conform to the chymopapain's mature chain. Three amino acids can be highlighted in this region, which are Cys159, His293 and Asn313, as they constitute the catalytic tryad of the enzyme. Cys159 and His293 are the two residues that perform the catalysis of the substrate while Asn313 interacts with Cys159 and properly orients its imidazolium ring to allow the reaction to happen, thus bearing an essential function in the catalysis too.

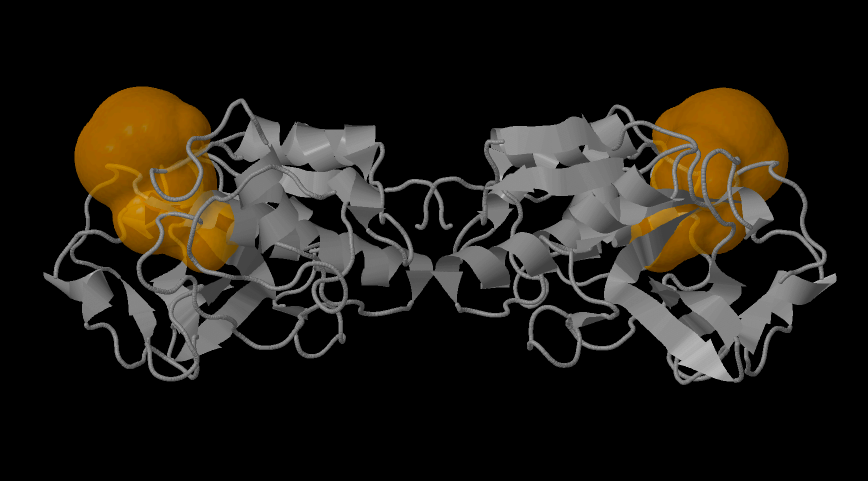
Image obtained using HotSpot Wizard 3.0 software by uploading chymopapain's PDB structure. A dimer of chymopapain can be observed. The highlighted orange regions represent the active site of each main chain.

=== Secondary and tertiary structures ===
Chymopapain's structure was solved by X-ray diffraction techniques. Analysis of this structure showed chymopapain to have 7 alpha helix regions, 10 beta sheet regions and 2 loop turns. These 2 turns are the main difference between chymopapain's structure and other papaya proteinase proteins such as papain or caricain, which have similar conformations.

Besides, chymopapain presents 3 disulfide bonds as post-traducional modifications stablished between residues 156–197, 190–229 and 287–338.

=== Quaternary structure ===
Chymopapain presents a quaternary structure characterized by the formation of homo dimers, which means that two chymopapain chains join each other through weak interactions to conform one unique biological structure.

== Function ==
As well as all the other enzymes in the PLCPs group, chymopapain is a cysteine protease. Proteases are enzymes that hydrolyse peptide bonds between the residues that conform a protein. In every hydrolysis a water molecule is released. Specifically, a cysteine protease is an enzyme which breaks the peptide bond by using the thiol group of a cysteine residue as the nucleophile. In order to hydrolyse, the whole catalytic triad of the enzyme must be used. This is constituted by a cysteine, the Cys159 residue, a histidine, the His203 residue, and a third residue, which tends to be an asparagine, specifically the Asn313 residue. The functional groups used in the reaction are the thiol group of the cysteine and the imidazolium ring of a histidine. The asparagine residue works orientating the imidazolium ring of the histidine.

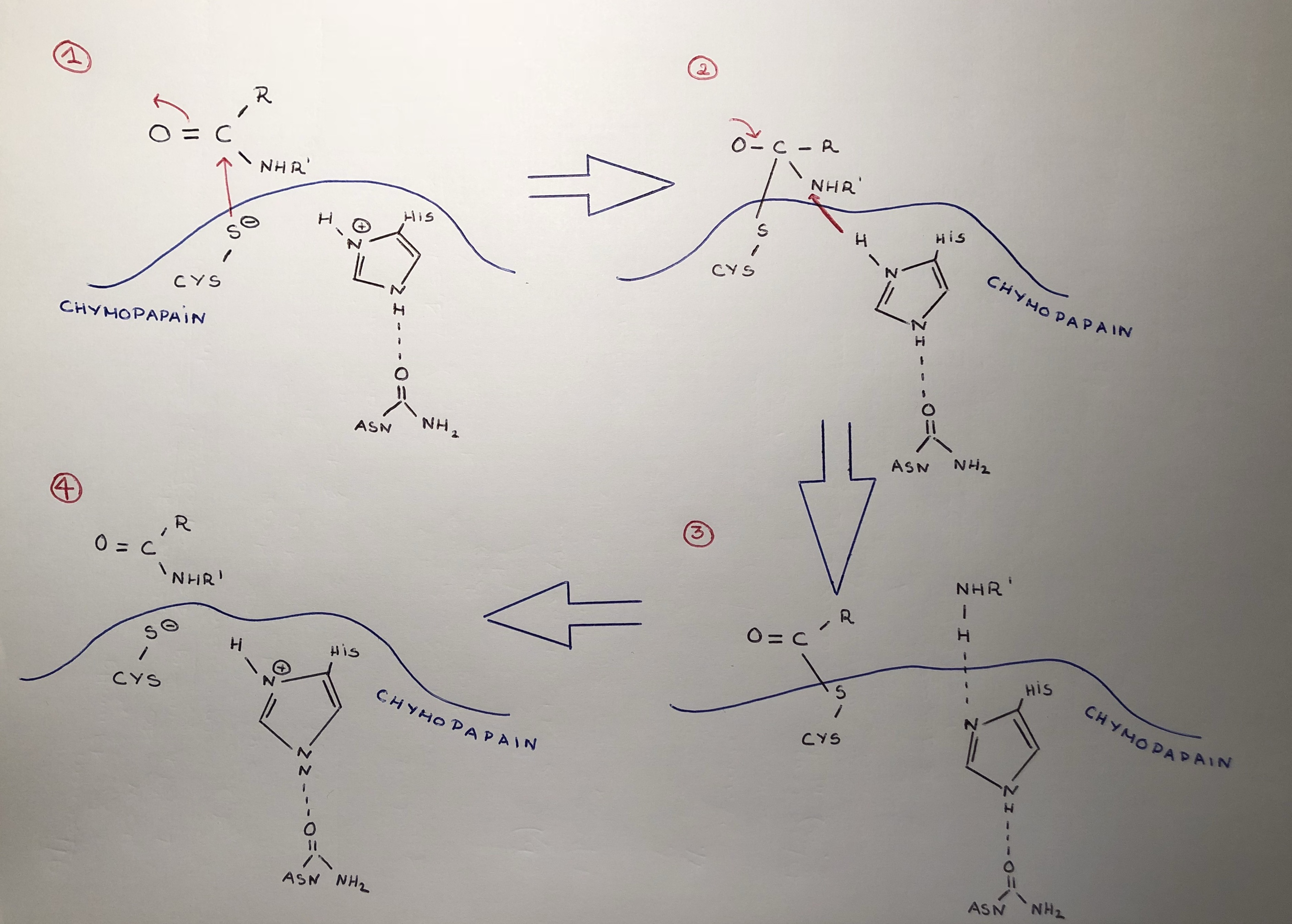
Chymopapain hydrolysis mechanism step by step.

The mechanism followed is exposed below:

1. The thiol group from the cysteine loses a proton, so it becomes negative charged and the amino group of the histidine catches a proton, which gives it a positive charge.
2. The cysteine makes a bond with the carbon breaking the carbon's double bond with oxygen and converting it into a simple bond.
3. The amino group is attracted by the positive charge of the histidine and a bond between these two is formed. The peptide bond is now broken and the carbonyl group is remade.
4. The NH_{2}R group is released from the histidine. The bond between the thiol group from the cysteine and the carbon is broken and a NHR group replaces it.

When this two bonds are broken, the catalytic triad from the chymopapain is available to be used again.

== Synthesis ==
Chymopapain is no longer used as a standard method to treat chronic low back pain because of its potential side effects. Therefore, there is no need to synthesize it artificially. In fact, the sale and distribution of this protein was discontinued in the US in 2003.

Despite the huge amount of successful use to treat herniated disk disease, chymopapain use was discontinued not because of hazards or inadequacies but rather because it is no longer available due to a decision by its sole manufacturer to stop production.

However, several studies have demonstrated different successful methods to extract and isolate the protease, which vary among authors. The most common procedure is the one described by Baines & Brocklehurst in 1979.

In order to obtain the protein, Carica Papaya fruits are used, as chymopapain is found in its latex. The papayas should be just in the previous step before maturation, which implies an average diameter of 6–10 cm.

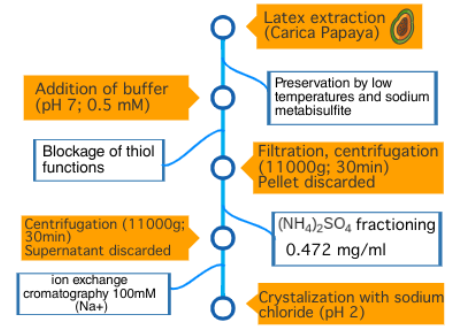
Chymopapain extraction and isolation

Some longitudinal incisions of 2mm of depth have to be made through the skin to proceed to the extraction of latex, which can be collected in solid form some minutes after the extraction. The proteases present in the latex of the fruit are inactive precursors that are activated once the papaya is wounded. In 0.3 ml of latex there are about 15 mg of chymopapain.

If we want to conserve the proteolytic properties, latex has to be preserved with sodium metabisulfite and stored at a low temperature of about -10 °C. If used immediately after the incisions, a buffer is added to extract the proteins: EDTA, ammonium sulfate or phosphate buffer all with a concentration of 0.5 mM and a pH of 7.

It is also important to block the thiol functions to avoid air oxidation and the loss of proteolytic activity.

To eliminate organic and insoluble molecules, the sample is first filtered and afterwards centrifuged at 11000g for 30min. The pellet is discarded and the supernatant added to 96% alcohol with a ratio of 1:3. Impurities precipitate and can be eliminated by filtration. Afterwards, (NH_{4})_{2}SO_{4} fractioning is done by addition of this substance at a concentration of 0.472 mg/ml. Chymopapain precipitates and can be retrieved through another centrifugation, again at 11000g for 30min. The supernatant is discarded and the ion exchange chromatography can be carried out, with a linear gradient of 100mM (Na^{+}) and different volumes of elution. Studying A_{280} chymopapain is found in the fraction of 750-1000 ml.

Once chymopapain has been isolated, it can be crystallized through the gradual addition of sodium chloride at pH 2.0, which can take up to 4 days.

== Medical applications ==
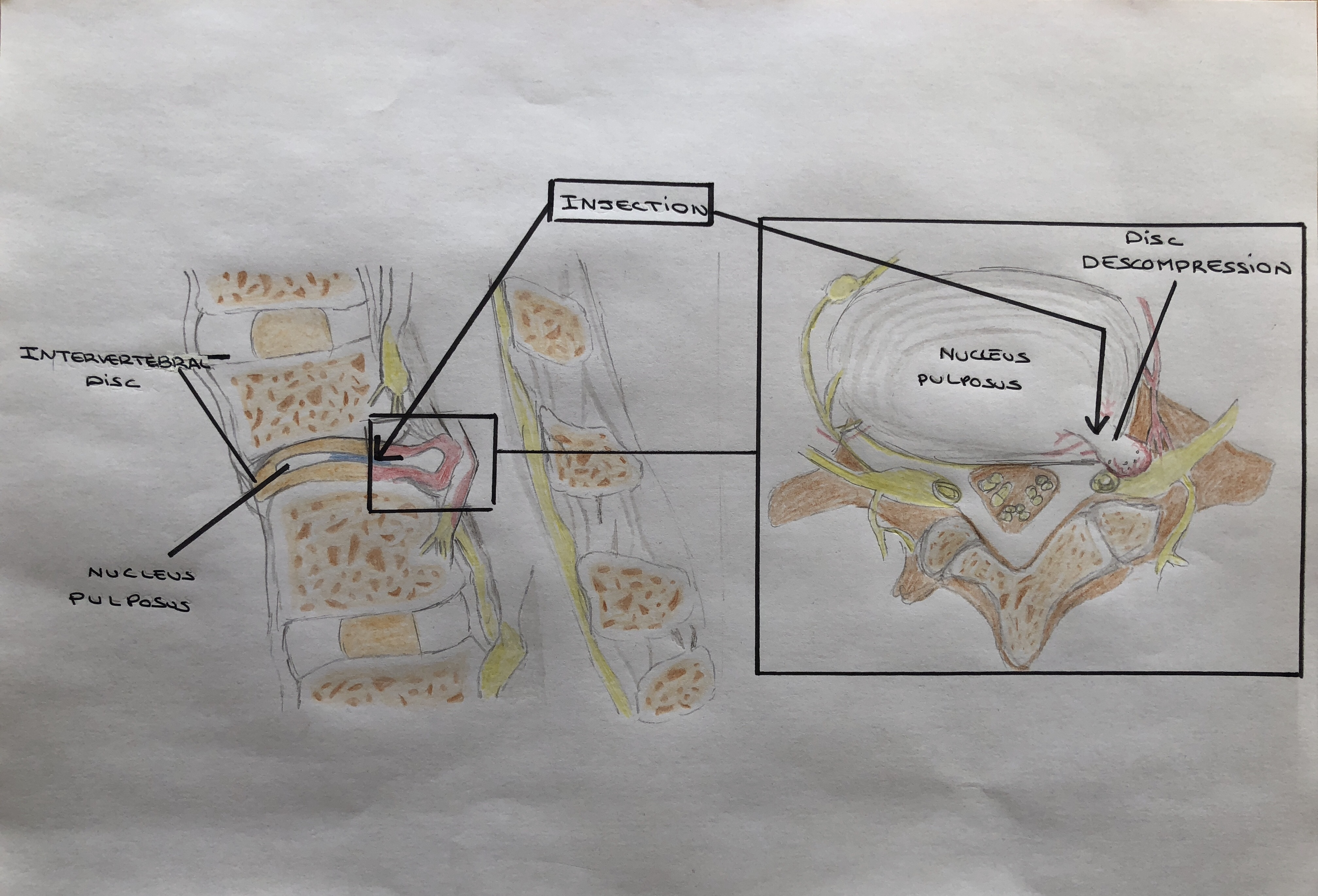
Herniated nucleus pulposus of an intervertebral disc.

Chymopapain
Clinical data
- Routes of administration: Injection into intervertebral disc
- ATC code: M09AB01 (WHO)

Legal status
- Legal status: In general: ℞ (Prescription only)

Identifiers
- CAS Number: 9001-09-6
- ChemSpider: none
- UNII: 1UK146T40N
- ChEMBL: ChEMBL1201626

Chymopapain is one of the substracts used in chemonucleolysis (a type of percutaneous discectomy). This method was a new proposal to treat primary lumbar intervertebral disc disease using a nonsurgical method. As a matter of fact, the treatment consists on an injection of proteolytic enzymes to dissolve the herniated nucleus pulposus of the intervertebral discs. Purified chymopapain is the main component of the injection, composed basically of 20 mg in five millilitres. It is provided in vials containing 10.000 units of the lyophilized agent with 0.37 mg of disodium edetate, 3.5 mg of cysteine hydrochloride monohydrate and 1.0 mg of bisulfide. All of them work as stabilisers and activators. Sodium hydroxide is in charge of adjusting the PH of the solution. Then, the injection is rehydrated with 5 milliliters of sterile water.

A surgeon injects the solution directly into the herniated disc on the spine to dissolve part of it and ease the pain. This process is under fluoroscopic control. Chymopapain is responsible for catalysis, both in vivo and in vitro, a rapid reduction in the viscosity and, as a consequence, the weight of the nucleus pulposus. In fact, it is a depolymerization of the chondromucoprotein and a decrease in the ability of a disk to imbibe fluid. The dose for a single intervertebral disc is 2 to 4 nanokatals, with a maximum dose per patient of 8 nanokatals. Chymopapain injections are normally given under local, rather than general, anaesthesia.

This enzyme has been studied by universities departments around the world. It was tested as much in animals as in humans and, very rarely, did it cause serious side effects including paralysis of the legs and death. It could also cause anaphylaxis, but it was only seen in 1% of the patients who received the medication.

The sale and distribution of chymopapain was discontinued in the United States on January 27, 2003, after the company producing it decided to stop selling it worldwide.

== See also ==
- Papain
