= Phenylenediamine =

Phenylenediamine may refer to:

- o-Phenylenediamine or OPD, a chemical compound C_{6}H_{4}(NH_{2})_{2}
- m-Phenylenediamine or MPD, a chemical compound C_{6}H_{4}(NH_{2})_{2}
- p-Phenylenediamine or PPD, a chemical compound C_{6}H_{4}(NH_{2})_{2}

== Related compounds ==
- N,N-Dimethyl-p-phenylenediamine or DMPD
- N,N,N′,N′-Tetramethyl-p-phenylenediamine or TMPD, used in microbiology
- N,N-Diethyl-p-phenylenediamine or DPD
