= 1,1-Dimethylethylenediamine =

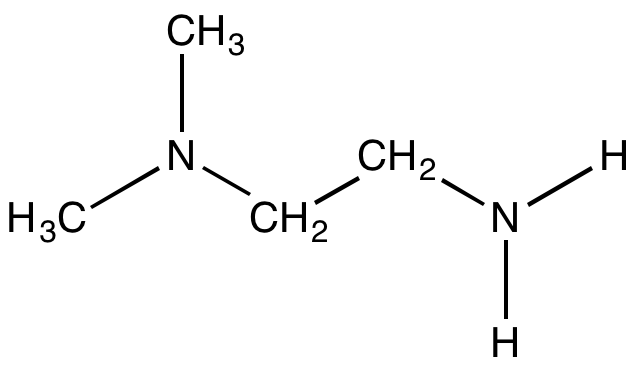

Names
- Preferred IUPAC name N,N-Dimethylethane-1,2-diamine
- Other names N,N-Dimethyl-1,2-ethanediamine

Identifiers
CAS Number	108-00-9
3D model (JSmol)	Interactive image
ChemSpider	59443
ECHA InfoCard	100.003.220
PubChem CID	66053
UNII	GJ3A38X3M9
CompTox Dashboard (EPA)	DTXSID7059357
- InChI: InChI=1S/C4H12N2/c1-6(2)4-3-5/h3-5H2,1-2H3 Key: DILRJUIACXKSQE-UHFFFAOYSA-N
- SMILES: CN(C)CCN

Properties
Chemical formula	C_{4}H_{12}N_{2}
Molar mass	88.154 g·mol^{−1}
Appearance	Colorless liquid
Boiling point	107 °C (225 °F; 380 K)
- Except where otherwise noted, data are given for materials in their standard state (at 25 °C [77 °F], 100 kPa). Infobox references

1,1-Dimethylethylenediamine is the organic compound with the formula (CH_{3})_{2}NCH_{2}CH_{2}NH_{2}. It is a colorless liquid with a fishy odor, featuring one primary amine and a tertiary amine. It is used to prepare chelating diamine-containing ligands for the synthesis of metal catalysts. Additionally, it is a precursor to the drug chloropyramine.

== See also ==
- 1,2-Dimethylethylenediamine
- Dimethylaminopropylamine
