= C6H6N2O2 =

The molecular formula C_{6}H_{6}N_{2}O_{2} (molar mass: 138.12 g/mol) may refer to:

- Nitroanilines
  - 2-Nitroaniline
  - 3-Nitroaniline
  - 4-Nitroaniline
- Urocanic acid
- cis-Urocanic acid
