= Nitroaniline =

The term nitroaniline in chemistry refers to a derivative of aniline (C_{6}H_{5}NH_{2}) containing a nitro group (—NO_{2}) There are three simple nitroanilines of formula C_{6}H_{4}(NH_{2})(NO_{2}) which differ only in the position of the nitro group:

- 2-Nitroaniline
- 3-Nitroaniline
- 4-Nitroaniline

Some more complicated molecules with other substituents can also be referred to as nitroanilines, for example 4-chloro-3-nitro-aniline.
