= Carl Julius Fritzsche =

German chemist (1808–1871)

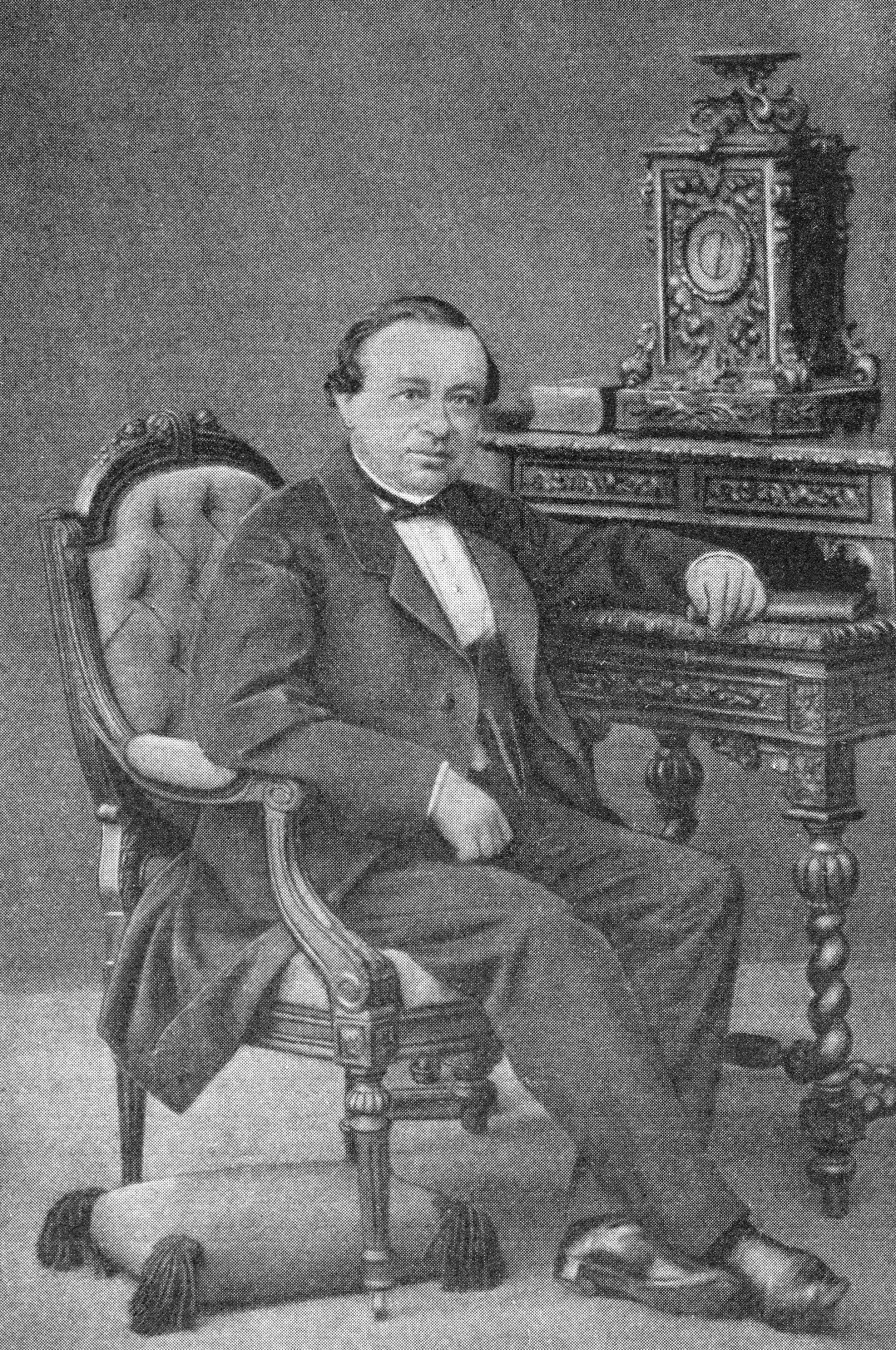
Julius Fedorovich Fritsche - chemist, member of the St. Petersburg Academy of Sciences.

Carl Julius Fritzsche (17 October 1808 in Neustadt – 8 June 1871) was a German pharmacist and chemist. He was a nephew of pharmacist Friedrich Adolph August Struve (1781–1840).

After five years spent working at his uncle's pharmacy in Dresden, he moved to Berlin, where he worked for two and a half years in the laboratory of chemist Johann Gottfried August Helming (1770–1830). In 1830 he became an assistant to Eilhard Mitscherlich at Berlin, subsequently receiving his doctorate with a thesis on pollen, Dissertatio de plantarum polline (1833). In 1844 he became an associate professor in St. Petersburg, where in 1852 he attained a full professorship.

In his studies of anthracene, he discovered that "paranthracene" was an isomeric modification of anthracene when anthracene was exposed to sunlight. Also, he was able to obtain the crystalline compounds of picric acid with hydrocarbons (benzene, naphthalene, etc.) In addition, he studied the nature of murexide and recognized it as the ammonium salt of purpuric acid.

He is credited with coining the term "aniline" from the Sanskrit word for the indigo plant. In 1841 he obtained aniline by distilling indigo with caustic potash. In 1865, August Breithaupt named a mineral Mn(UO_{2})_{2}(PO_{4},VO_{4})_{2} · 10H_{2}O (?) "fritzscheite" in his honor.
