= D-benzoylarginine-4-nitroanilide amidase =

Identifiers
- EC no.: 3.5.1.72
- CAS no.: 119345-26-5

Databases
- IntEnz: IntEnz view
- BRENDA: BRENDA entry
- ExPASy: NiceZyme view
- KEGG: KEGG entry
- MetaCyc: metabolic pathway
- PRIAM: profile
- PDB structures: RCSB PDB PDBe PDBsum
- Gene Ontology: AmiGO / QuickGO
Search
- PMC: articles
- PubMed: articles
- NCBI: proteins

In enzymology, a D-benzoylarginine-4-nitroanilide amidase (EC 3.5.1.72) is an enzyme that catalyzes the chemical reaction

N-benzoyl-D-arginine-4-nitroanilide + H_{2}O $\rightleftharpoons$ N-benzoyl-D-arginine + 4-nitroaniline

Thus, the two substrates of this enzyme are N-benzoyl-D-arginine-4-nitroanilide and H_{2}O, whereas its two products are N-benzoyl-D-arginine and 4-nitroaniline.

This enzyme belongs to the family of hydrolases, those acting on carbon-nitrogen bonds other than peptide bonds, specifically in linear amides. The systematic name of this enzyme class is N-benzoyl-D-arginine-4-nitroanilide amidohydrolase. Other names in common use include benzoyl-D-arginine arylamidase, and D-BAPA-ase.
