= N-Methylaniline =

- Aniline

Names
- Preferred IUPAC name N-Methylaniline
- Other names N-methylbenzenamine; N-Monomethylaniline; Anilinomethane; N-phenylmethylamine; Monomethylaniline; N-methylaminobenzene; Methylbenzeneamine; N-Methyl-phenylamine (methylamino) benzene

Identifiers
CAS Number	100-61-8
3D model (JSmol)	Interactive image
ChEBI	CHEBI:15733
ChemSpider	7234
ECHA InfoCard	100.002.610
EC Number	249-927-4
KEGG	C02299
PubChem CID	7515
RTECS number	BY4550000
UNII	TH45GK410O
UN number	2294
CompTox Dashboard (EPA)	DTXSID9021841
- InChI: InChI=1S/C7H9N/c1-8-7-5-3-2-4-6-7/h2-6,8H,1H3 Key: AFBPFSWMIHJQDM-UHFFFAOYSA-N
- SMILES: CNC1=CC=CC=C1

Properties
Chemical formula	C_{7}H_{9}N
Molar mass	107.156 g·mol^{−1}
Appearance	colorless liquid
Odor	weak, ammonia-like
Density	0.99 g/mL
Melting point	−57 °C (−71 °F; 216 K)
Boiling point	194 to 196 °C (381 to 385 °F; 467 to 469 K)
Solubility in water	Insoluble
Vapor pressure	0.3 mmHg (20 °C)
Magnetic susceptibility (χ)	−82.74·10^{−6} cm^{3}/mol

Hazards
- GHS labelling
Pictograms	(GHS06: Toxic) (GHS08: Health hazard) (GHS09: Environmental hazard)
Signal word	Danger
Hazard statements	H301, H311, H331, H373, H410
Precautionary statements	P260, P264, P270, P271, P273, P280, P301+P310, P302+P352, P304+P340, P311, P312, P314, P321, P322, P330, P361, P363, P391, P403+P233, P405, P501
Flash point	79 °C; 175 °F; 353 K
- Lethal dose or concentration (LD, LC)
LD_{Lo} (lowest published)	280 mg/kg (rabbit, oral); 1200 mg/kg (guinea pig, oral)
- NIOSH (US health exposure limits)
PEL (Permissible)	TWA 2 ppm (9 mg/m^{3}) [skin]
REL (Recommended)	TWA 0.5 ppm (2 mg/m^{3}) [skin]
IDLH (Immediate danger)	100 ppm

Related compounds
Related aromatic amines	Aniline; Dimethylaniline
Related compounds	Toluidines
- Except where otherwise noted, data are given for materials in their standard state (at 25 °C [77 °F], 100 kPa). verify (what is ?) Infobox references

N-Methylaniline (NMA) is an aniline derivative. It is an organic compound with the chemical formula C_{6}H_{5}NH(CH_{3}). The substance is a colorless viscous liquid. Samples turn brown when exposed to air. The chemical is insoluble in water. It is used as a latent and coupling solvent and is also used as an intermediate for dyes, agrochemicals and other organic products manufacturing. NMA is toxic and exposure can cause damage to the central nervous system and can also cause liver and kidney failure. The comprehensive evaluation of N-methylaniline by the Bureau for Chemical Substances in Poland, completed in 2024 as a part of the European Union's REACH regulation, has confirmed significant concerns regarding the carcinogenicity and mutagenicity of N-methylaniline.

== Use as a fuel additive ==
N-Methylaniline is a principal component of NMA (monomethylaniline), a non-traditional antiknock agent increasingly used by petroleum refiners and fuel distributors around the world to increase the octane number of gasoline petrol. It is usually added to gasoline in concentration of around 1.3% volume to avoid high gum levels that can cause increased carbon deposits in engine parts. Higher concentrations are permitted by most regulatory agencies if a detergent and a fuel combustion modifier are added to the component to keep gum formation from happening. NMA blended in those concentrations to gasoline / petrol is not more toxic than the hundreds of chemicals that compose this fuel.

In a paper published on the The New England Journal of Medicine in September 2026, a series of toxicological analyses from the poison control center of the Istituti Clinici Scientifici Maugeri in Pavia found that, between March 2024 and December 2025, a total of 82 migrant patients admitted to the port of Lampedusa had contracted severe methemoglobinemia due to dermal absorption of N-methylaniline from fuel-contaminated seawater while crossing the Central Mediterranean sea route by boat. Most of the patients were successfully treated with methylene blue, but 38 patients suffered hemolytic anemia as a complication, frequently needing blood transfusions, and two patients died from complications of the poisoning.

=== Policies on blending NMA in gasoline ===
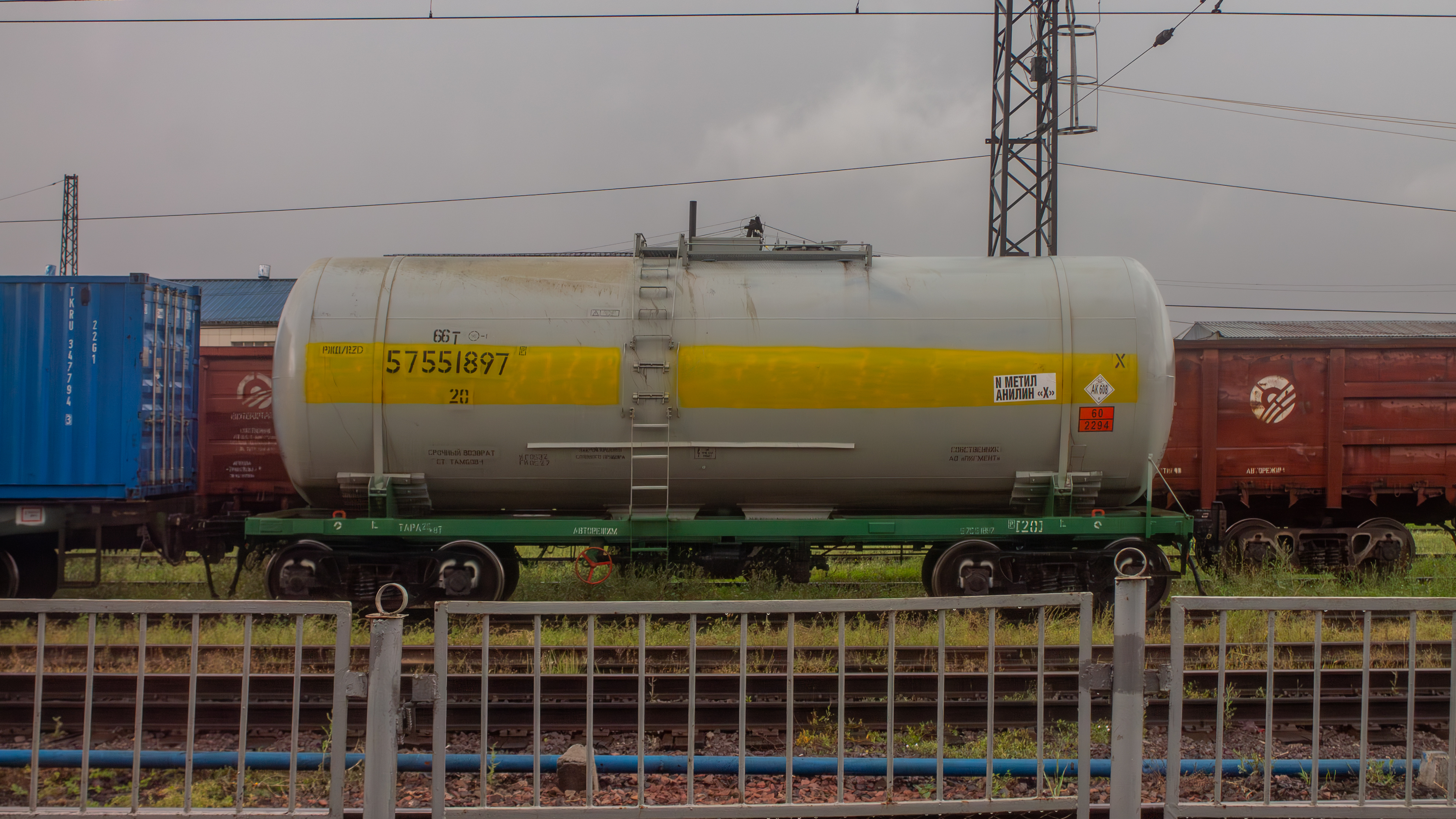
Tank railcar carrying N-methylaniline in Astana, Kazakhstan

==== China ====
China has banned the use of most chemical gasoline additives, including NMA, in gasoline standard directive GB17930-2013 dated Dec. 18 2013, which states that “Additives used in gasoline for motor vehicles should not contain recognised harmful substances and should be used by following up with the recommended safe dosage. Chemicals, such as methylal, aniline-type compounds, halogens and those containing phosphorus and silicon, etc. should not intentionally be added in gasoline.”

==== United States ====
N-Methylaniline as is (neat) does not appear on the U.S. Environmental Protection Agency’s (EPA) List of Registered Gasoline Additives. However, registration can be obtained at higher concentration which maximum authorized dosage depends on a suitable detergent and an effective fuel combustion modifier added to this component.

Fuel additives in the United States are regulated under section 211 of the Clean Air Act (as amended in January 1995). The Environmental Protection Agency (EPA) requires the registration of all fuel additives which are commercially distributed for use in highway motor vehicles in the United States, and may require testing and ban harmful additives. The EPA also regularly reviews the health and net economic benefits of Clean Air Act policies. The act also requires deposit control additives (DCAs) be added to all gasolines. This type of additive is a detergent additive that acts as a cleansing agent in small passages in the carburetor or fuel injectors. This in turn serves to ensure a consistent air and fuel mixture that will contribute to better gas mileage.

==== Europe ====
It appears that only one NMA based product for use as an octane enhancer is registered with ECHA / REACH. Because it is not an oxygenate this component does not appear on the list of recommended oxygenates in European Union (EU) petrol standards. Referring to EU EN 228:2012 and Directive 2009/30/EC, Automotive Fuels of Unleaded Petrol. Requirements and Test Methods.

==== Worldwide Fuel Charter ====
Because it is not an oxygenate NMA does not appear on the list of recommended oxygenates under category 4 of the Worldwide Fuel Charter published by the European Automobile Manufacturers Association (ACEA), which refers to emission standards for unleaded gasoline for “markets with advanced requirements for emission control.” Under policies that are specific to those countries NMA is banned in China and Russia. Most other countries follow the environmental rules of registration of the United States and Europe for the use of this component as an octane enhancer in gasoline / petrol.

== Other reactions ==
It may be reacted with diglycidyl aniline to produce a complex mixture of cyclic products including 7 and 8 membered rings.

== See also ==
- N,N-Dimethylaniline
