= Suosan =

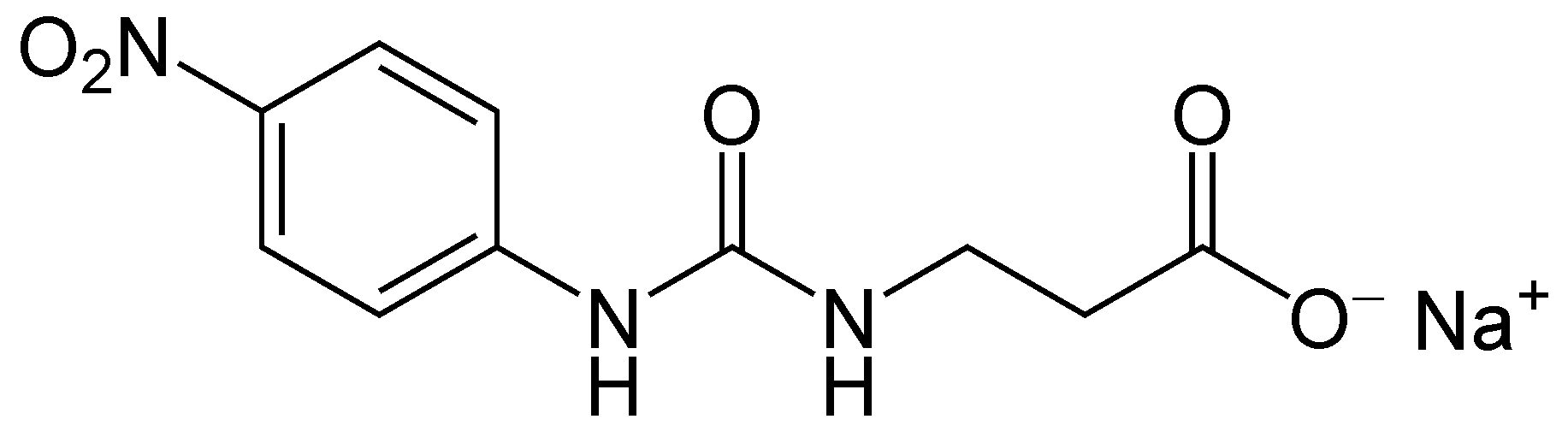

Names
- IUPAC name Sodium N-[(4-nitrophenyl)carbamoyl]-β-alaninate
- Systematic IUPAC name Sodium 3-{[(4-nitrophenyl)carbamoyl]amino}propanoate
- Other names N-(((4-Nitrophenyl)amino)carbonyl)-β-alanine monosodium salt

Identifiers
CAS Number	140-46-5
3D model (JSmol)	Interactive image
ChemSpider	8473
PubChem CID	8803
UNII	6V7T3M79X3
CompTox Dashboard (EPA)	DTXSID30930689
- InChI: InChI=1S/C10H11N3O5.Na/c14-9(15)5-6-11-10(16)12-7-1-3-8(4-2-7)13(17)18;/h1-4H,5-6H2,(H,14,15)(H2,11,12,16);/q;+1/p-1 Key: HWQUPWFLAWYYBO-UHFFFAOYSA-M
- SMILES: C1=CC(=CC=C1NC(=O)NCCC(=O)O)[N+](=O)[O-]

Properties
Chemical formula	C_{10}H_{10}N_{3}NaO_{5}
Molar mass	275.196 g·mol^{−1}
Melting point	240 °C (464 °F; 513 K)
- Except where otherwise noted, data are given for materials in their standard state (at 25 °C [77 °F], 100 kPa). verify (what is ?) Infobox references

Suosan is calorie-free artificial sweetener derived from β-alanine, discovered in 1948 by Petersen et Muller.

Suosan is a sodium salt of p-Nitrophenylcarbamidopropionic acid and is 700 times sweeter than sucrose (table sugar) with a bitter aftertaste. It was never commercialized due to its low solubility in water, particularly under acidic pH (which limited its use, particularly in soft drinks) and concerns that it might form the toxic compound 4-nitroaniline.

== See also ==
- Aspartame
