= C6H4Cl2N2O2 =

The molecular formula C_{6}H_{4}Cl_{2}N_{2}O_{2} may refer to:

- Aminopyralid
- 2,6-Dichloro-4-nitroaniline
