= Nikolay Zinin =

Russian chemist (1812–1880)

Nikolay Nikolaevich Zinin
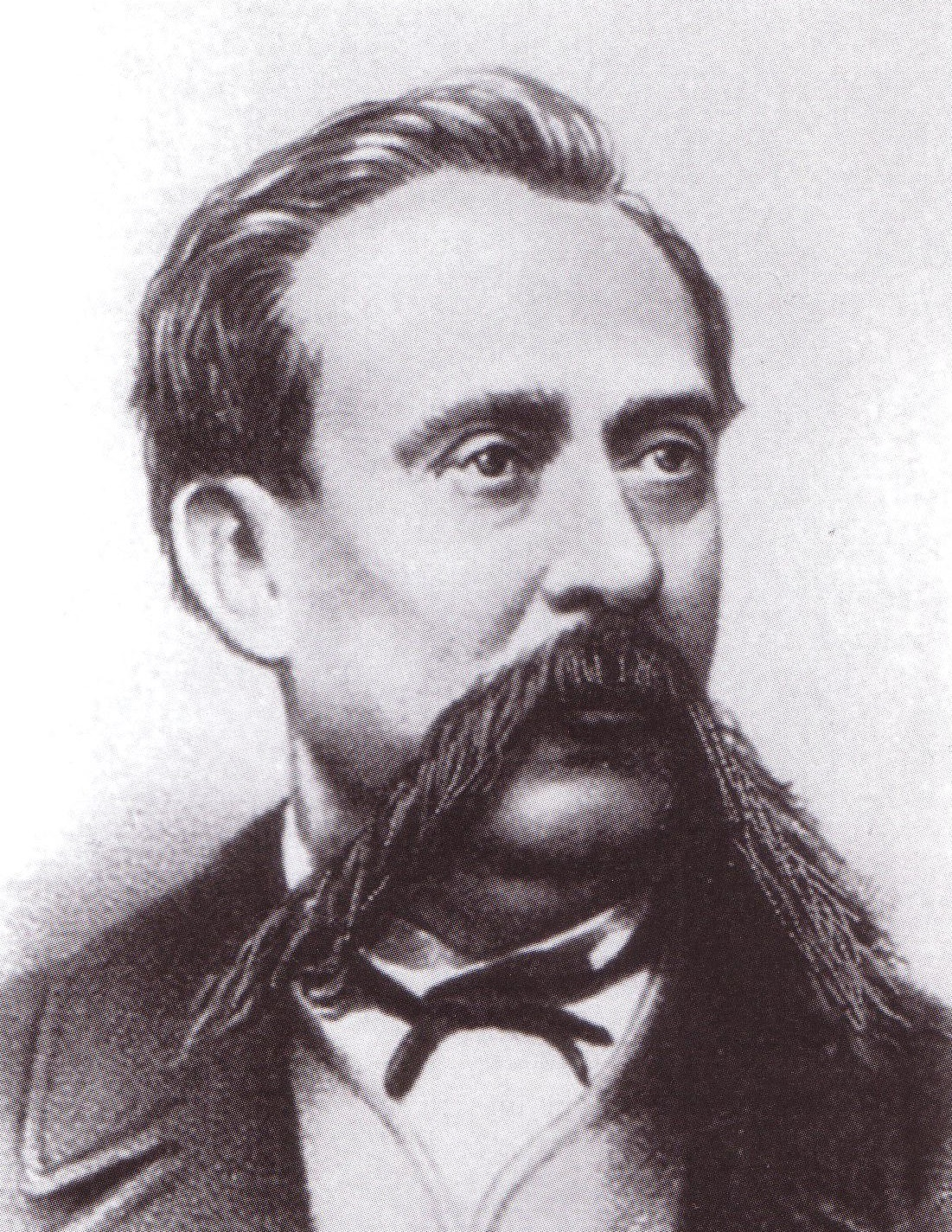
- Nikolay Zinin
- Born: 25 August 1812; Shusha, Elizavetpol Governorate, Russian Empire
- Died: 18 February 1880 (aged 67); Saint Petersburg, Russian Empire
- Education: University of Kazan
- Scientific career
- Workplaces: University of Kazan; University of Saint Petersburg
- Doctoral advisor: Justus Liebig
- Doctoral students: Alexander Borodin; Aleksandr Butlerov

Nikolay Nikolaevich Zinin (Russian: Никола́й Никола́евич Зи́нин; 25 August 1812 – 18 February 1880) was a Russian organic chemist.

== Life ==
Zinin was born in Shusha where his father served as diplomatic employee. Nicolay became orphan after cholera pandemic when his parents and sister died. He studied at the University of Kazan where he graduated in mathematics but he started teaching chemistry in 1835. To improve his skills he was asked to study in Europe for some time, which he did between 1838 and 1841. He studied with Justus Liebig in Giessen, where he finished his research on the benzoin condensation, which was discovered by Liebig several years before. He presented his research results at the University of Saint Petersburg, where he received his Ph.D. He became Professor for Chemistry in the same year at the University of Kazan and left for the University of Saint Petersburg in 1847 where he also became a member of the St. Petersburg Academy of Sciences and first president of the Russian Physical and Chemical Society (1868–1877).

In St. Petersburg, professor Zinin was a private teacher of chemistry to the young Alfred Nobel.

== Work ==
He is known for the so-called Zinin reaction or Zinin reduction, in which nitro aromates like nitrobenzene are converted to amines by reduction with ammonium sulfides. In 1842 Zinin played an important role in identifying aniline.
