= Zinin reaction =

Chemical reaction

Named after	Nikolay Zinin
Reaction type	Organic redox reaction

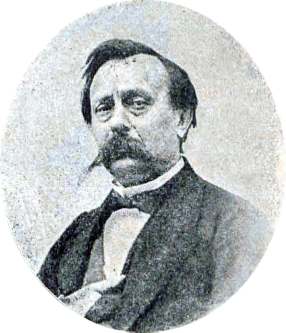
Zinin, Nikolai Nikolaevich

Zinin reaction or Zinin reduction involves reduction of nitro aromatic compounds to the amines using sodium sulfide. It is used to convert nitrobenzenes to anilines. The reaction selectively reduces nitro groups in the presence of other easily reduced functional groups (e.g., aryl halides and C=C bonds) are present in the molecule.

== Reaction mechanism and example ==
The reaction requires water, with thiosulfate being formed as a by-product. A possible stoichiometry for the reaction is:

4 ArNO_{2} + 6 S^{2−} + 7 H_{2}O → 4 ArNH_{2} + 3 S_{2}O^{2−}_{3} + 6 OH^{−}

Mechanistic studies have implicated a role for disulfide that is generated in situ. Nitrosobenzenes (ArNO) and phenylhydroxylamine (ArNHOH) are probable intermediates.

Dinitrobenzenes can often be reduced selectively to the nitroaniline, for example in the synthesis of 3-nitroaniline from 1,3-dinitrobenzene

== History ==
The reaction was discovered by a Russian organic chemist Nikolay Zinin (Russian: Николай Николаевич Зинин) (25 August 1812, Shusha – 18 February 1880, Saint Petersburg).
