= Friedrich Adolph August Struve =

Friedrich Adolph August Struve (9 May 1781, Neustadt in Sachsen – 29 September 1840, Berlin) was a German pharmacist and balneologist.

== Biography ==
He studied medicine at the Universities of Leipzig and Halle, then continued his education at Johann Peter Frank's clinic in Vienna. In 1803 he settled into a medical practice in his hometown of Neustadt. Two years later, he acquired an apothecary shop in Dresden through marriage, and subsequently gave up his medical practice, choosing to devote his time to technical and scientific work.

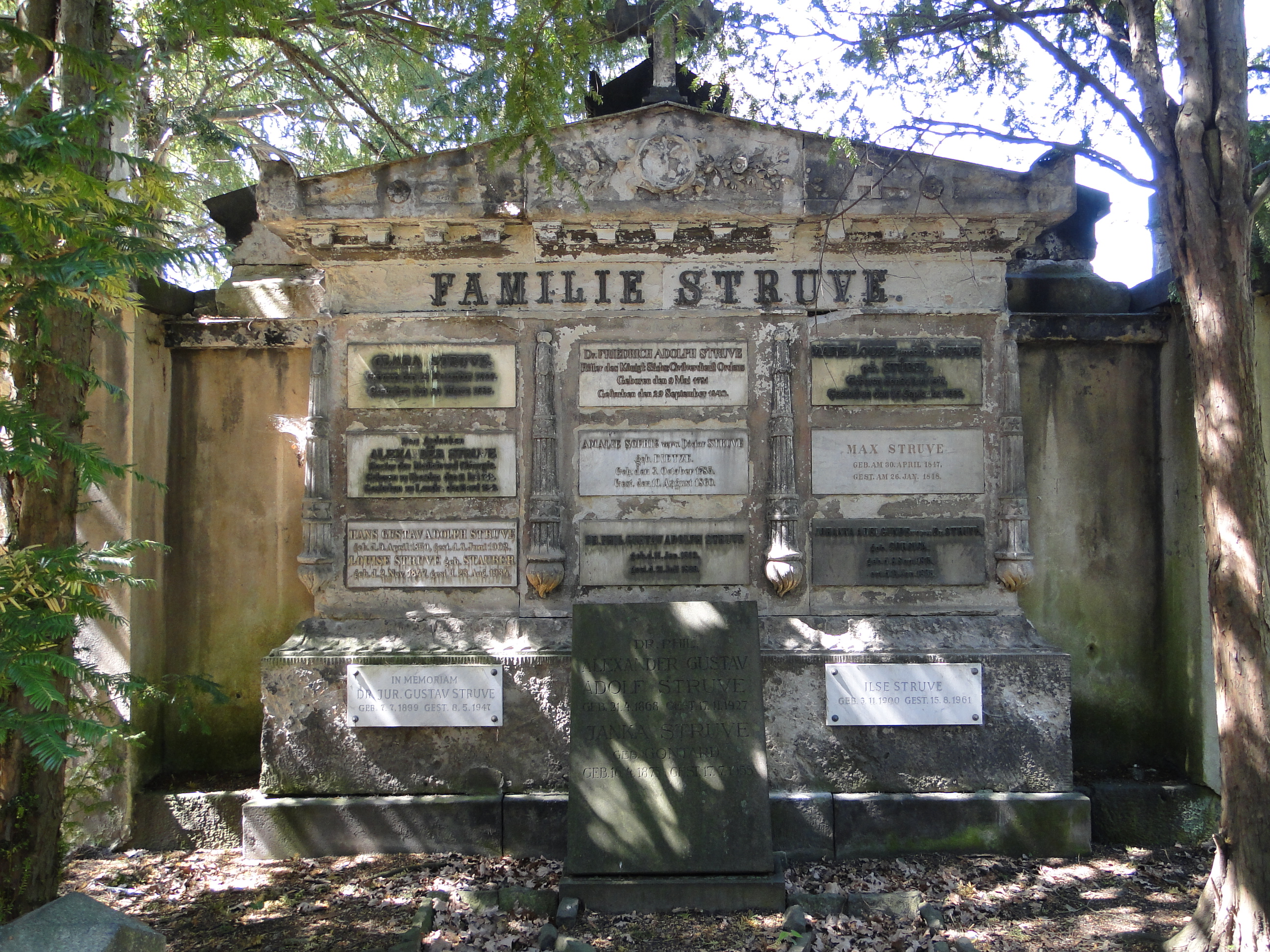
Gravesite of F. A. A. Struve at the Trinitatisfriedhof in Dresden

After taking spa treatments in Karlsbad and Marienbad, he came up with the idea of artificially replicating mineral waters by chemical means. After years of effort, the practical implementation of a spa utilizing artificial mineral water finally came to fruition. Together with mechanic Rudolf Bloch, who had produced and constructed the necessary equipment, the first mineral water facilities were established in 1820 at Dresden. Afterwards, similar institutions were built in Leipzig, Berlin, Brighton (the "Royal German Spaa"), Königsberg, Warsaw, Moscow, St. Petersburg, Kyiv and other cities.

In September 1830, he played an important role during the so-called "Uprising in Dresden", subsequently becoming involved in local politics. From 1833 up until his death, he served as deputy mayor. In 1837 he became a representative of Dresden in the second chamber of the Saxon parliament.

== Published works ==
- "Remarks on an institution for the preparation and use of artificial mineral waters in Great Britain", 1823.
- Über die Nachbildung der natürlichen Heilquellen, 1824.
