= 2-Nitroaniline =

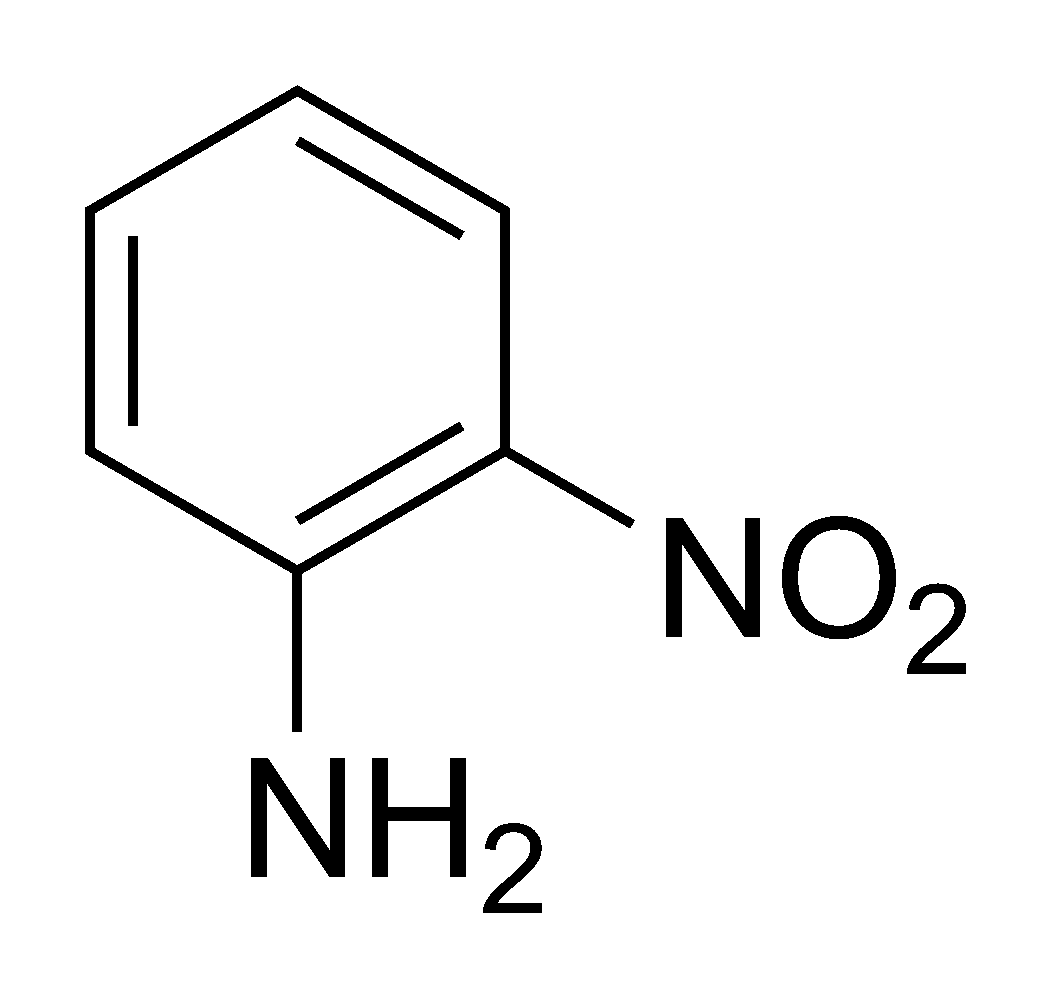

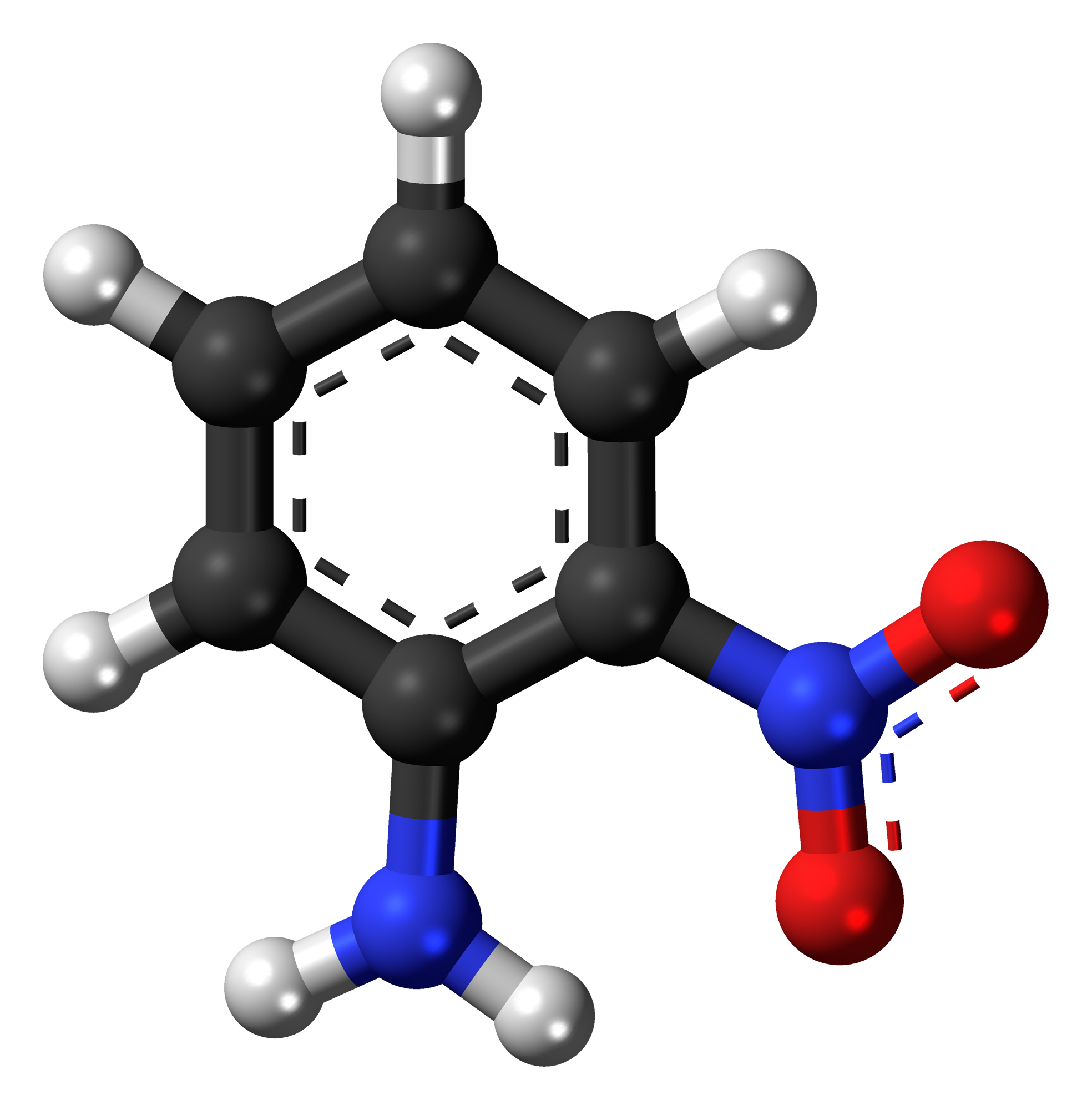

Names
- Preferred IUPAC name 2-Nitroaniline
- Other names ortho-Nitroaniline o-Nitroaniline

Identifiers
CAS Number	88-74-4
3D model (JSmol)	Interactive image
ChEMBL	ChEMBL274009
ChemSpider	13853943
ECHA InfoCard	100.001.687
EC Number	201-855-4
PubChem CID	6946
RTECS number	BY6650000
UNII	2519U0541L
UN number	1661
CompTox Dashboard (EPA)	DTXSID1025726
- InChI: InChI=1S/C6H6N2O2/c7-5-3-1-2-4-6(5)8(9)10/h1-4H,7H2 Key: DPJCXCZTLWNFOH-UHFFFAOYSA-N; InChI=1/C6H6N2O2/c7-5-3-1-2-4-6(5)8(9)10/h1-4H,7H2 Key: DPJCXCZTLWNFOH-UHFFFAOYAV
- SMILES: O=[N+]([O-])c1ccccc1N

Properties
Chemical formula	C_{6}H_{6}N_{2}O_{2}
Molar mass	138.126 g·mol^{−1}
Appearance	Orange solid
Density	1.442 g/ml
Melting point	71.5 °C (160.7 °F; 344.6 K)
Boiling point	284 °C (543 °F; 557 K)
Solubility in water	0.117 g/100 ml (20°C) (SIDS)
Acidity (pK_{a})	−0.3 (of anilinium salt)
Magnetic susceptibility (χ)	−66.47·10^{−6} cm^{3}/mol

Hazards
- GHS labelling
Pictograms	(GHS06: Toxic) (GHS08: Health hazard)
Signal word	Danger
Hazard statements	H301, H311, H331, H373, H412
Precautionary statements	P260, P264, P270, P271, P273, P280, P301+P310, P302+P352, P304+P340, P311, P312, P314, P321, P322, P330, P361, P363, P403+P233, P405, P501
Flash point	168 °C (334 °F; 441 K)

Related compounds
Related compounds	3-Nitroaniline, 4-Nitroaniline
- Except where otherwise noted, data are given for materials in their standard state (at 25 °C [77 °F], 100 kPa). verify (what is ?) Infobox references

2-Nitroaniline is an organic compound with the formula H_{2}NC_{6}H_{4}NO_{2}. It is a derivative of aniline, carrying a nitro functional group in position 2. It is mainly used as a precursor to o-phenylenediamine.

== Synthesis ==
2-Nitroaniline is prepared commercially by the reaction of 2-nitrochlorobenzene with ammonia:

ClC_{6}H_{4}NO_{2} + 2 NH_{3} → H_{2}NC_{6}H_{4}NO_{2} + NH_{4}Cl

Many other methods exist for the synthesis of this compound. Direct nitration of aniline is inefficient since anilinium is produced instead. Nitration of acetanilide gives only traces of 2-nitro isomer is obtained due to the great steric effect of the amide. Sulfonation is usually used to block the 4 position and increases the effectiveness to 56%.

Laboratory routes to produce 2-nitroaniline

== Uses and reactions ==
2-Nitroaniline is the main precursor to phenylenediamines, which are converted to benzimidazoles, a family of heterocycles that are key components in pharmaceuticals.

Intramolecular hydrogen-bonding results in a very low basicity for 2-nitroaniline.

Aside from its reduction to phenylenediamine, 2-nitroaniline undergoes other reactions anticipated for aromatic amines. It is protonated to give the anilinium salts. Owing to the influence of the nitro substituent, the amine exhibits a basicity nearly 100,000x lower than aniline itself. Diazotization gives diazonium derivative, which is a precursor to some diazo dyes. Acetylation affords 2-nitroacetanilide.

== See also ==
- 3-Nitroaniline
- 4-Nitroaniline
