= 3-Nitroaniline =

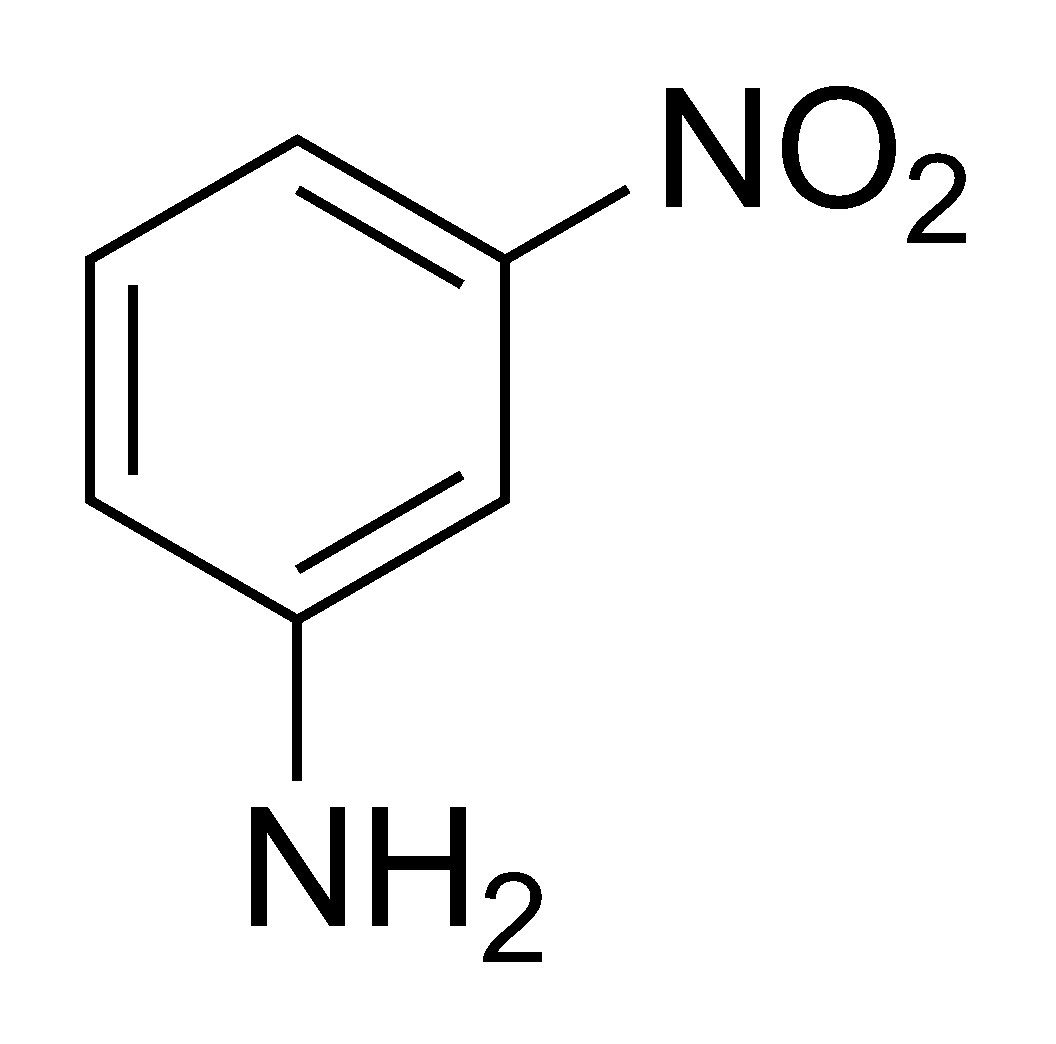

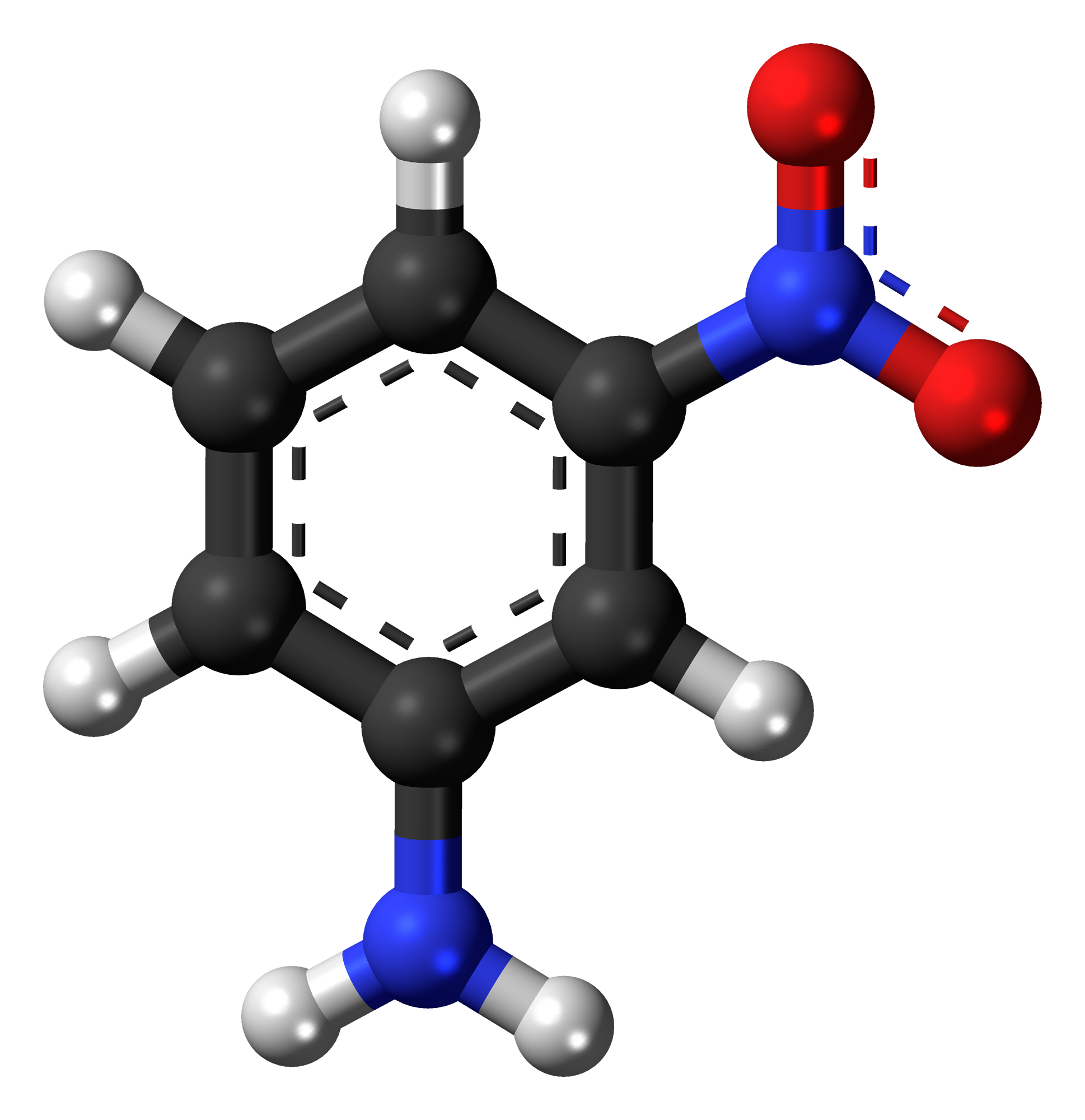

Names
- Preferred IUPAC name 3-Nitroaniline
- Other names meta-Nitroaniline m-Nitroaniline

Identifiers
CAS Number	99-09-2
3D model (JSmol)	Interactive image
ChEMBL	ChEMBL14068
ChemSpider	7145
ECHA InfoCard	100.002.481
EC Number	202-729-1
PubChem CID	7423
RTECS number	BY6825000
UNII	CM50SM561T
UN number	1661
CompTox Dashboard (EPA)	DTXSID6025725
- InChI: InChI=1S/C6H6N2O2/c7-5-2-1-3-6(4-5)8(9)10/h1-4H,7H2 Key: XJCVRTZCHMZPBD-UHFFFAOYSA-N; InChI=1/C6H6N2O2/c7-5-2-1-3-6(4-5)8(9)10/h1-4H,7H2 Key: XJCVRTZCHMZPBD-UHFFFAOYAY
- SMILES: O=[N+]([O-])c1cccc(N)c1

Properties
Chemical formula	C_{6}H_{6}N_{2}O_{2}
Molar mass	138.126 g·mol^{−1}
Appearance	Yellow solid
Density	0.9011
Melting point	114 °C (237 °F; 387 K)
Boiling point	306 °C (583 °F; 579 K)
Solubility in water	0.1 g/100 ml (20 °C)
Acidity (pK_{a})	2.47
Magnetic susceptibility (χ)	−70.09·10^{−6} cm^{3}/mol

Hazards
- GHS labelling
Pictograms	(GHS06: Toxic) (GHS08: Health hazard)
Signal word	Danger
Hazard statements	H301, H311, H331, H373, H412
Precautionary statements	P260, P264, P270, P271, P273, P280, P301+P310, P302+P352, P304+P340, P311, P312, P314, P321, P322, P330, P361, P363, P403+P233, P405, P501

Related compounds
Related compounds	2-Nitroaniline, 4-Nitroaniline
- Except where otherwise noted, data are given for materials in their standard state (at 25 °C [77 °F], 100 kPa). verify (what is ?) Infobox references

3-Nitroaniline is an organic compound with the formula H_{2}NC_{6}H_{4}NO_{2}. A yellow solid, it is a derivative of aniline, carrying a nitro functional group in position 3. It is an isomer of 2-nitroaniline and 4-nitroaniline. It is used as a precursor to dyes.

== Synthesis and applications ==
Structure of disperse yellow 5, a disperse dye derived from 3-nitroaniline.

3-Nitroaniline is produced on a commercial scale by reduction of 1,3-dinitrobenzene with hydrogen sulfide, or sodium sulfide (a Zinin reaction).

It is used as a chemical intermediate for azo coupling component and the dyes disperse yellow 5 and acid blue 29.
