= Diglycidyl aniline =

Names
- IUPAC name N,N-bis(oxiran-2-ylmethyl)aniline
- Other names Diglycidylaniline; Bis(2,3-epoxypropyl)aniline; Bis(epoxypropyl)phenylamine; Diglycidyl aniline; N,N-Bis(2,3-epoxypropyl)aniline; N,N-Di(2,3-epoxypropyl)aniline; N,N-Diglycidylaniline; N-(Oxiranylmethyl)-N-phenyloxiranemethanamine; N-N-Diglycidylphenylamine; N-(2-oxiranylmethyl)-N-phenyl-2-oxiranemethanamine; N,N-bis(2,3-epoxypropyl)-aniline; N-(oxiranylmethyl)-N-phenyl-oxiranemethanamine

Identifiers
CAS Number	2095-06-9
3D model (JSmol)	Interactive image
ChemSpider	15563
ECHA InfoCard	100.016.599
EC Number	218-259-5
PubChem CID	16412
UNII	AZG5ZPK0BD
CompTox Dashboard (EPA)	DTXSID50862832
- InChI: InChI=1S/C12H15NO2/c1-2-4-10(5-3-1)13(6-11-8-14-11)7-12-9-15-12/h1-5,11-12H,6-9H2 Key: JAYXSROKFZAHRQ-UHFFFAOYSA-N
- SMILES: C1C(O1)CN(CC2CO2)C3=CC=CC=C3

Properties
Chemical formula	C_{12}H_{15}NO_{2}
Molar mass	205.255 g/mol
- Except where otherwise noted, data are given for materials in their standard state (at 25 °C [77 °F], 100 kPa). Infobox references

Diglycidyl aniline is an aromatic organic chemical in the glycidyl compound family. It is used to reduce the viscosity of epoxy resin systems. It has the empirical formula C_{12}H_{15}NO_{2} and the IUPAC name is N,N-bis(oxiran-2-ylmethyl)aniline. The CAS number is 2095-06-9. It is REACH registered in Europe with the EC number 218-259-5. A key use is in the viscosity reduction of epoxy resin systems functioning as a reactive diluent.

== Alternative names ==
- Diglycidylaniline
- N,N-Diglycidylaniline
- N,N-bis(oxiran-2-ylmethyl)aniline
- Oxiranemethanamine, N-(oxiranylmethyl)-N-phenyl-
- Bis(epoxypropyl)phenylamine
- Bis(2,3-epoxypropyl)aniline
- Bis(oxiranylmethyl)benzenamine
- Benzenamine, bis(oxiranylmethyl)-

== Manufacture and synthesis ==
Many glycidyl ethers are manufactured by addition of epichlorohydrin to a species with the aid of a Lewis acid as catalyst to form a halohydrin. This process is followed by washing with sodium hydroxide in a dehydrochlorination reaction. This diglycidyl compound being basic and nitrogen based, does not need this type of catalyst. One of the quality control tests would involve measuring the Epoxy value by determination of the epoxy equivalent weight in addition to viscosity.

== Uses ==
The use of the diluent in epoxy systems affects the mechanical properties and microstructure of epoxy resins. The kinetics of cure of this Diglycidyl amine with epoxy resin networks have been studied. It has also been used to synthesize other materials including ion-exchange resins.

== Toxicity ==
The toxicity profile has been studied and published.

== External websites ==
- Technical Data Sheet
- Huntsman commercial product
- Diglycidyl ether based on aniline Parchem.com
