= 2,6-Dichloro-4-nitroaniline =

Names
- Preferred IUPAC name 2,6-Dichloro-4-nitroaniline
- Other names Amino-2,6-dichloro-4-nitrobenzene; Dicloran; Allisan; Batran; Bortran; Botran; Ditranil; Resisan

Identifiers
CAS Number	99-30-9
3D model (JSmol)	Interactive image
ChEBI	CHEBI:27864
ChEMBL	ChEMBL504381
ChemSpider	7152
ECHA InfoCard	100.002.497
EC Number	202-746-4
KEGG	C11000
PubChem CID	7430
UNII	F0BE9UC5J7
CompTox Dashboard (EPA)	DTXSID2020426
- InChI: InChI=1S/C6H4Cl2N2O2/c7-4-1-3(10(11)12)2-5(8)6(4)9/h1-2H,9H2 Key: BIXZHMJUSMUDOQ-UHFFFAOYSA-N
- SMILES: C1=C(C=C(C(=C1Cl)N)Cl)[N+](=O)[O-]

Properties
Chemical formula	C_{6}H_{4}Cl_{2}N_{2}O_{2}
Molar mass	207.01 g·mol^{−1}
Appearance	yellow solid
Density	1.624 g/cm^{3}
Melting point	191 °C (376 °F; 464 K)
Boiling point	130 °C (266 °F; 403 K) 2 torr
Solubility in water	6.3 mg/l

Hazards
- GHS labelling
Pictograms	(GHS06: Toxic) (GHS08: Health hazard) (GHS09: Environmental hazard)
Signal word	Danger
Hazard statements	H300, H310, H330, H373, H411
Precautionary statements	P260, P262, P264, P270, P271, P273, P280, P284, P301+P316, P302+P352, P304+P340, P316, P319, P320, P321, P330, P361+P364, P391, P403+P233, P405, P501
- Except where otherwise noted, data are given for materials in their standard state (at 25 °C [77 °F], 100 kPa). Infobox references

2,6-Dichloro-4-nitroaniline is an organic compound with the formula O_{2}NC_{6}H_{2}Cl_{2}NH_{2}. It is the most widely discussed isomer of dichloronitroaniline, mainly as a precursor to the azo dye disperse brown 1. It is prepared by treatment of 4-nitroaniline with a mixture of hydrochloric acid and hydrogen peroxide (a source of chlorine).
