= Aniline =

Organic compound (C6H5NH2); simplest aromatic amine

Structural formula of aniline
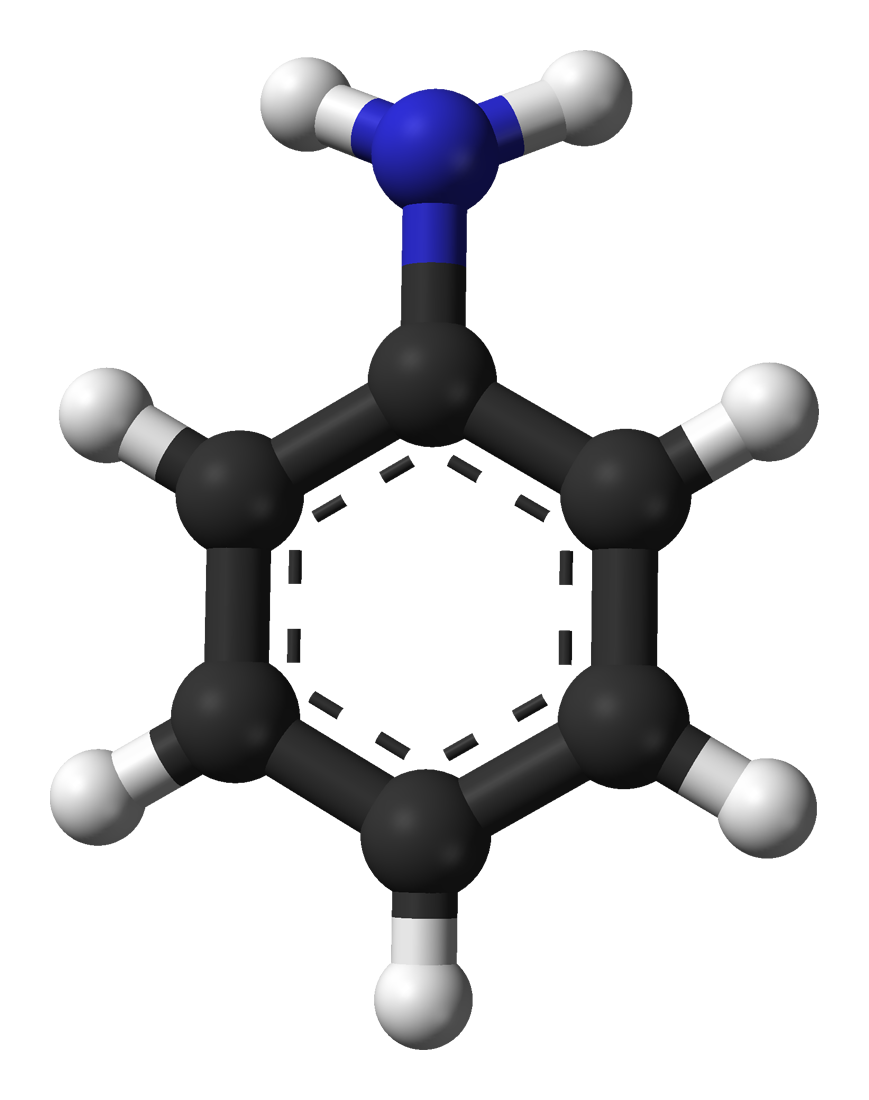
Aniline

Names
- Preferred IUPAC name Aniline
- Systematic IUPAC name Benzenamine
- Other names Phenylamine; Aminobenzene; Benzamine

Identifiers
CAS Number	62-53-3; 142-04-1 (HCl)
3D model (JSmol)	Interactive image; Interactive image
Abbreviations	PhNH_{2} H_{2}NPh
Beilstein Reference	605631
ChEBI	CHEBI:17296
ChEMBL	ChEMBL538
ChemSpider	5889
DrugBank	DB06728
ECHA InfoCard	100.000.491
EC Number	200-539-3
Gmelin Reference	2796
KEGG	C00292
PubChem CID	6115; 8870 (HCl)
RTECS number	BW6650000
UNII	SIR7XX2F1K; 576R1193YL (HCl)
UN number	1547
CompTox Dashboard (EPA)	DTXSID8020090
- InChI: InChI=1S/C6H7N/c7-6-4-2-1-3-5-6/h1-5H,7H2 Key: PAYRUJLWNCNPSJ-UHFFFAOYSA-N; InChI=1/C6H7N/c7-6-4-2-1-3-5-6/h1-5H,7H2 Key: PAYRUJLWNCNPSJ-UHFFFAOYAP
- SMILES: Nc1ccccc1; c1ccc(cc1)N

Properties
Chemical formula	C_{6}H_{7}N
Molar mass	93.129 g·mol^{−1}
Appearance	Colorless liquid
Density	1.0297 g/mL
Melting point	−6.30 °C (20.66 °F; 266.85 K)
Boiling point	184.13 °C (363.43 °F; 457.28 K)
Critical point (T, P)	698.8 K (425.7 °C), 4890 kPa
Solubility in water	3.6 g/(100 mL) at 20 °C
Vapor pressure	0.6 mmHg (20 °C)
Acidity (pK_{a})	4.63 (conjugate acid; H_{2}O)
Magnetic susceptibility (χ)	−62.95·10^{−6} cm^{3}/mol
Refractive index (n_{D})	1.58364
Viscosity	3.71 cP (3.71 mPa·s at 25 °C)

Thermochemistry
Heat capacity (C)	193.7 J/(mol K)
Std molar entropy (S^{⦵}_{298})	191 J/(mol K)
Std enthalpy of formation (Δ_{f}H^{⦵}_{298})	31 kJ/mol
Std enthalpy of combustion (Δ_{c}H^{⦵}_{298})	–3393 kJ/mol
Enthalpy of fusion (Δ_{f}H^{⦵}_{fus})	10.54 kJ/mol
Enthalpy of vaporization (Δ_{f}H_{vap})	55.83 kJ/mol at 25 °C

Hazards
- Occupational safety and health (OHS/OSH)
Main hazards	potential occupational carcinogen
- GHS labelling
Pictograms	(GHS05: Corrosive) (GHS06: Toxic) (GHS08: Health hazard) (GHS09: Environmental hazard) (GHS07: Exclamation mark)
Signal word	Danger
Hazard statements	H301, H311, H317, H318, H331, H341, H351, H372, H400
Precautionary statements	P201, P202, P260, P264, P270, P271, P272, P273, P280, P281, P301+P310, P302+P352, P304+P340, P305+P351+P338, P308+P313, P310, P311, P312, P314, P321, P322, P330, P333+P313, P361, P363, P391, P403+P233, P405, P501
NFPA 704 (fire diamond)	3 2 0
Flash point	70 °C (158 °F; 343 K)
Autoignition temperature	770 °C (1,420 °F; 1,040 K)
Explosive limits	1.3–11%
- Lethal dose or concentration (LD, LC)
LD_{Lo} (lowest published)	195 mg/kg (dog, oral); 250 mg/kg (rat, oral); 464 mg/kg (mouse, oral); 440 mg/kg (rat, oral); 400 mg/kg (guinea pig, oral)
LC_{50} (median concentration)	175 ppm (mouse, 7 h)
LC_{Lo} (lowest published)	250 ppm (rat, 4 h); 180 ppm (cat, 8 h)
- NIOSH (US health exposure limits)
PEL (Permissible)	TWA 5 ppm (19 mg/m^{3}) [skin]
REL (Recommended)	Ca [potential occupational carcinogen]
IDLH (Immediate danger)	100 ppm

Related compounds
Related aromatic amines	1-Naphthylamine; 2-Naphthylamine
Related compounds	Phenylhydrazine; Nitrosobenzene; Nitrobenzene

Supplementary data page
- Aniline (data page)
- Except where otherwise noted, data are given for materials in their standard state (at 25 °C [77 °F], 100 kPa). verify (what is ?) Infobox references

Aniline (From Portuguese: anil, meaning 'indigo shrub', and -ine indicating a derived substance) is an organic compound with the formula C_{6}H_{5}NH_{2}. Consisting of a phenyl group (−C_{6}H_{5}) attached to an amino group (−NH_{2}), aniline is the simplest aromatic amine. It is an industrially significant commodity chemical, as well as a versatile starting material for fine chemical synthesis. Its main use is in the manufacture of precursors to polyurethane, dyes, and other industrial chemicals. Like most volatile amines, it has the odor of rotten fish. It ignites readily, burning with a smoky flame characteristic of aromatic compounds. It is toxic to humans.

Relative to benzene, aniline is "electron-rich". It thus participates more rapidly in electrophilic aromatic substitution reactions. Likewise, it is also prone to oxidation: while freshly purified aniline is an almost colorless oil, exposure to air results in gradual darkening to yellow or red, due to the formation of strongly colored, oxidized impurities. Aniline can be diazotized to give a diazonium salt, which can then undergo various nucleophilic substitution reactions.

Like other amines, aniline is both a base (pK_{aH} = 4.6) and a nucleophile, although less so than structurally similar aliphatic amines.

Because an early source of the benzene from which they are derived was coal tar, aniline dyes are also called coal tar dyes.

== Structure ==
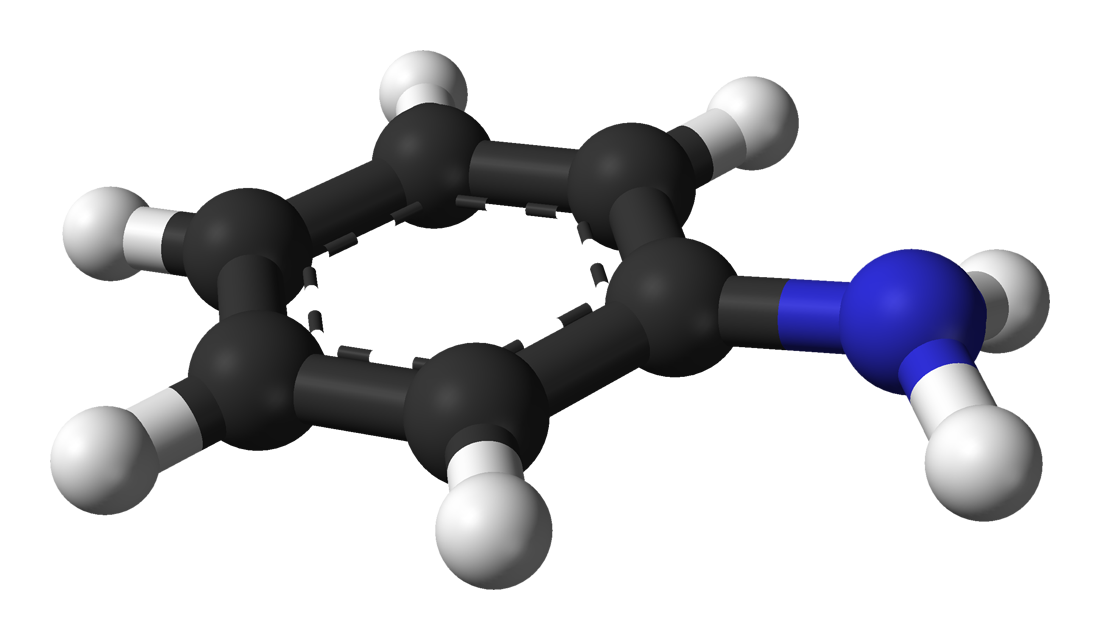
Ball-and-stick model of aniline from the crystal structure at 252 K

=== Aryl-N distances ===
In aniline, the C−N bond length is 1.41 Å, compared to the C−N bond length of 1.47 Å for cyclohexylamine, indicating partial π-bonding between C(aryl) and N. The length of the chemical bond of C(aryl)−NH_{2} in anilines is highly sensitive to substituent effects. The C−N bond length is 1.34 Å in 2,4,6-trinitroaniline vs 1.44 Å in 3-methylaniline.

=== Pyramidalization ===
The amine group in anilines is slightly pyramidal. The hybridization of nitrogen is describe somewhere between sp^{3} and sp^{2}. The lone pair of electrons on nitrogen have high p character. The amino group in aniline is flatter (i.e., it is a "shallower pyramid") than that in an aliphatic amine, an effect attributed to conjugation of the lone pair with the aryl substituent. The observed geometry reflects a compromise between two competing factors: 1) stabilization of the N lone pair in an orbital with significant s character favors pyramidalization (orbitals with s character are lower in energy), while 2) delocalization of the N lone pair into the aryl ring favors planarity (a lone pair in a pure p orbital gives the best overlap with the orbitals of the benzene ring π system).

Consistent with these factors, substituted anilines with electron donating groups are more pyramidalized, while those with electron withdrawing groups are more planar. In the parent aniline, the lone pair is approximately 12% s character, corresponding to sp^{7.3} hybridization. (For comparison, alkylamines generally have lone pairs in orbitals that are close to sp^{3}.)

The pyramidalization angle between the C–N bond and the bisector of the H–N–H angle is 142.5°. For comparison, in more strongly pyramidal amine group in methylamine, this value is ~125°, while that of the amine group in formamide has an angle of 180°.

== Production ==
Industrial aniline production involves hydrogenation of nitrobenzene (typically at 200–300 °C) in the presence of metal catalysts: Approximately 4 million tonnes are produced annually. Catalysts include nickel, copper, palladium, and platinum, and newer catalysts continue to be discovered.

The reduction of nitrobenzene to aniline was first performed by Nikolay Zinin in 1842, using sulfide salts (Zinin reaction). The reduction of nitrobenzene to aniline was also performed as part of reductions by Antoine Béchamp in 1854, using iron as the reductant (Bechamp reduction). These stoichiometric routes remain useful for specialty anilines.

Aniline can alternatively be prepared from ammonia and phenol derived from the cumene process.

=== Related aniline derivatives ===
Many analogues and derivatives of aniline are known where the phenyl group is further substituted. These include toluidines, xylidines, chloroanilines, aminobenzoic acids, nitroanilines, and many others. They also are usually prepared by nitration of the substituted aromatic compounds followed by reduction. For example, this approach is used to convert toluene into toluidines and chlorobenzene into 4-chloroaniline. Alternatively, using Buchwald-Hartwig coupling or Ullmann reaction approaches, aryl halides can be aminated with aqueous or gaseous ammonia.

== Reactions ==
The chemistry of aniline is rich because the compound has been cheaply available for many years. Below are some classes of its reactions.

=== Oxidation ===
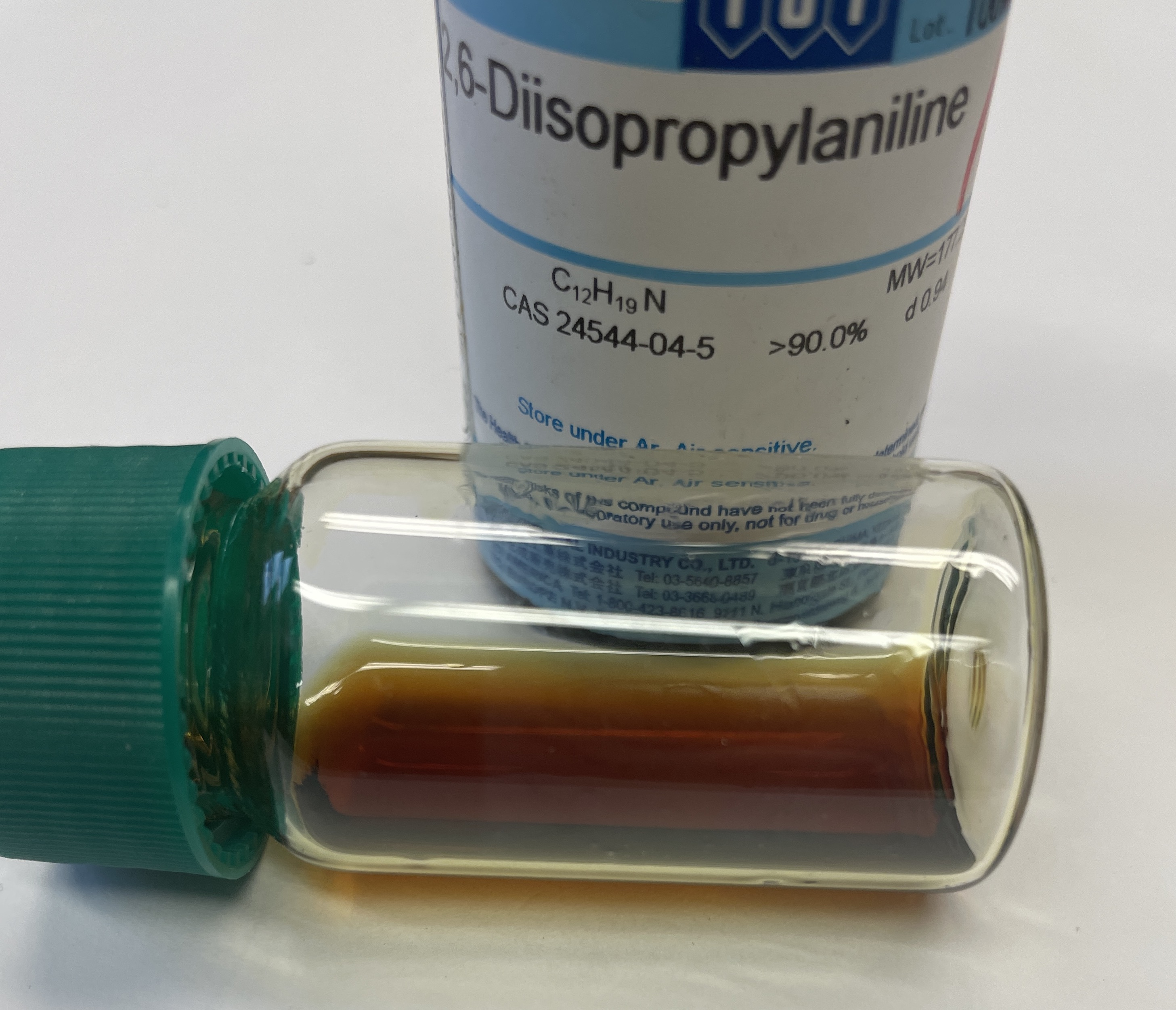
Sample of 2,6-diisopropylaniline, a colorless liquid when pure, illustrating the tendency of anilines to air-oxidize to dark-colored products.

The oxidation of aniline has been heavily investigated, and can result in reactions localized at nitrogen or more commonly results in the formation of new C-N bonds. In alkaline solution, azobenzene results, whereas arsenic acid produces the violet-coloring matter violaniline. Chromic acid converts it into quinone, whereas chlorates, in the presence of certain metallic salts (especially of vanadium), give aniline black. Hydrochloric acid and potassium chlorate give chloranil. Potassium permanganate in neutral solution oxidizes it to nitrobenzene; in alkaline solution to azobenzene, ammonia, and oxalic acid; in acid solution to aniline black. Hypochlorous acid gives 4-aminophenol and para-amino diphenylamine. Oxidation with persulfate affords a variety of polyanilines. These polymers exhibit rich redox and acid-base properties.

Polyanilines can form upon oxidation of aniline.

=== Electrophilic reactions at ortho- and para- positions ===
Like phenols, aniline derivatives are highly susceptible to electrophilic substitution reactions. Its high reactivity reflects that it is an enamine, which enhances the electron-donating ability of the ring. For example, reaction of aniline with sulfuric acid at 180 °C produces sulfanilic acid, H_{2}NC_{6}H_{4}SO_{3}H.

If bromine water is added to aniline, the bromine water is decolourised and a white precipitate of 2,4,6-tribromoaniline is formed. To generate the mono-substituted product, a protection with acetyl chloride is required:

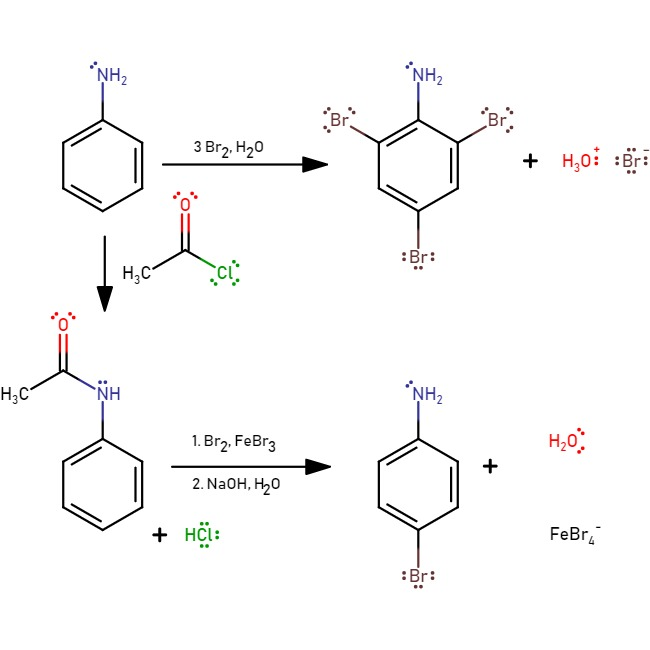
Aniline can react with bromine even in room temperatures in water. Acetyl chloride is added to prevent tribromination.

The reaction to form 4-bromoaniline is to protect the amine with acetyl chloride, then hydrolyse back to reform aniline.

The largest scale industrial reaction of aniline involves its alkylation with formaldehyde. An idealized equation is shown:

2 C_{6}H_{5}NH_{2} + CH_{2}O → CH_{2}(C_{6}H_{4}NH_{2})_{2} + H_{2}O

The resulting diamine is the precursor to 4,4'-MDI and related diisocyanates.

=== Reactions at nitrogen ===
==== Basicity ====
Aniline is a weak base. Aromatic amines such as aniline are, in general, much weaker bases than aliphatic amines. Aniline reacts with strong acids to form the anilinium (or phenylammonium) ion (C_{6}H_{5}−NH^{+}_{3}).

Traditionally, the weak basicity of aniline is attributed to a combination of inductive effect from the more electronegative sp^{2} carbon and resonance effects, as the lone pair on the nitrogen is partially delocalized into the pi system of the benzene ring. (see the picture below):

The lone electron pair on the nitrogen delocalizes into the pi system of the benzene ring. This is responsible for nitrogen's weaker basicity compared to other amines.

Missing in such an analysis is consideration of solvation. Aniline is, for example, more basic than ammonia in the gas phase, but ten thousand times less so in aqueous solution.

==== Acylation ====
Aniline reacts with acyl chlorides such as acetyl chloride to give amides. The amides formed from aniline are sometimes called anilides, for example CH_{3}−C(=O)−NH−C_{6}H_{5} is acetanilide. At high temperatures aniline and carboxylic acids react to give the anilides.

==== N-Alkylation ====
N-Methylation of aniline with methanol at elevated temperatures over acid catalysts gives N-methylaniline and N,N-dimethylaniline:

C_{6}H_{5}NH_{2} + 2 CH_{3}OH → C_{6}H_{5}N(CH_{3})_{2} + 2H_{2}O

N-Methylaniline and N,N-dimethylaniline are colorless liquids with boiling points of 193–195 °C and 192 °C, respectively. These derivatives are of importance in the color industry.

==== Carbon disulfide derivatives ====
Boiled with carbon disulfide, it gives sulfocarbanilide (diphenylthiourea) (S=C(−NH−C_{6}H_{5})_{2}), which may be decomposed into phenyl isothiocyanate (C_{6}H_{5}−N=C=S), and triphenyl guanidine (C_{6}H_{5}−N=C(−NH−C_{6}H_{5})_{2}).

==== Diazotization ====
Aniline and its ring-substituted derivatives react with nitrous acid to form diazonium salts. One example is benzenediazonium tetrafluoroborate. Through these intermediates, the amine group can be converted to a hydroxyl (−OH), cyanide (−CN), or halide group (−X, where X is a halogen) via Sandmeyer reactions. This diazonium salt can also be reacted with NaNO_{2} and phenol to produce a dye known as benzeneazophenol, in a process called coupling. The reaction of converting primary aromatic amine into diazonium salt is called diazotisation. In this reaction primary aromatic amine is allowed to react with sodium nitrite and 2 moles of HCl, which is known as "ice cold mixture" because the temperature for the reaction was as low as 0.5 °C. The benzene diazonium salt is formed as major product alongside the byproducts water and sodium chloride.

=== Other reactions ===
It reacts with nitrobenzene to produce phenazine in the Wohl–Aue reaction. Hydrogenation gives cyclohexylamine.

Being a standard reagent in laboratories, aniline is used for many niche reactions. Its acetate is used in the aniline acetate test for carbohydrates, identifying pentoses by conversion to furfural. It is used to stain neural RNA blue in the Nissl stain.

In addition, aniline is the starting component in the production of diglycidyl aniline. Epichlorohydrin is the other main ingredient.

== Uses ==
Aniline is predominantly used for the preparation of methylenedianiline and related compounds by condensation with formaldehyde. The diamines are condensed with phosgene to give methylene diphenyl diisocyanate, a precursor to urethane polymers.

Most aniline is consumed in the production of methylenedianiline, a precursor to polyurethanes.

Other uses include rubber processing chemicals (9%), herbicides (2%), and dyes and pigments (2%). As additives to rubber, aniline derivatives such as phenylenediamines and diphenylamine, are antioxidants. The drug paracetamol (acetaminophen, Tylenol) is prepared from aniline. The principal use of aniline in the dye industry is as a precursor to indigo, the blue of blue jeans.

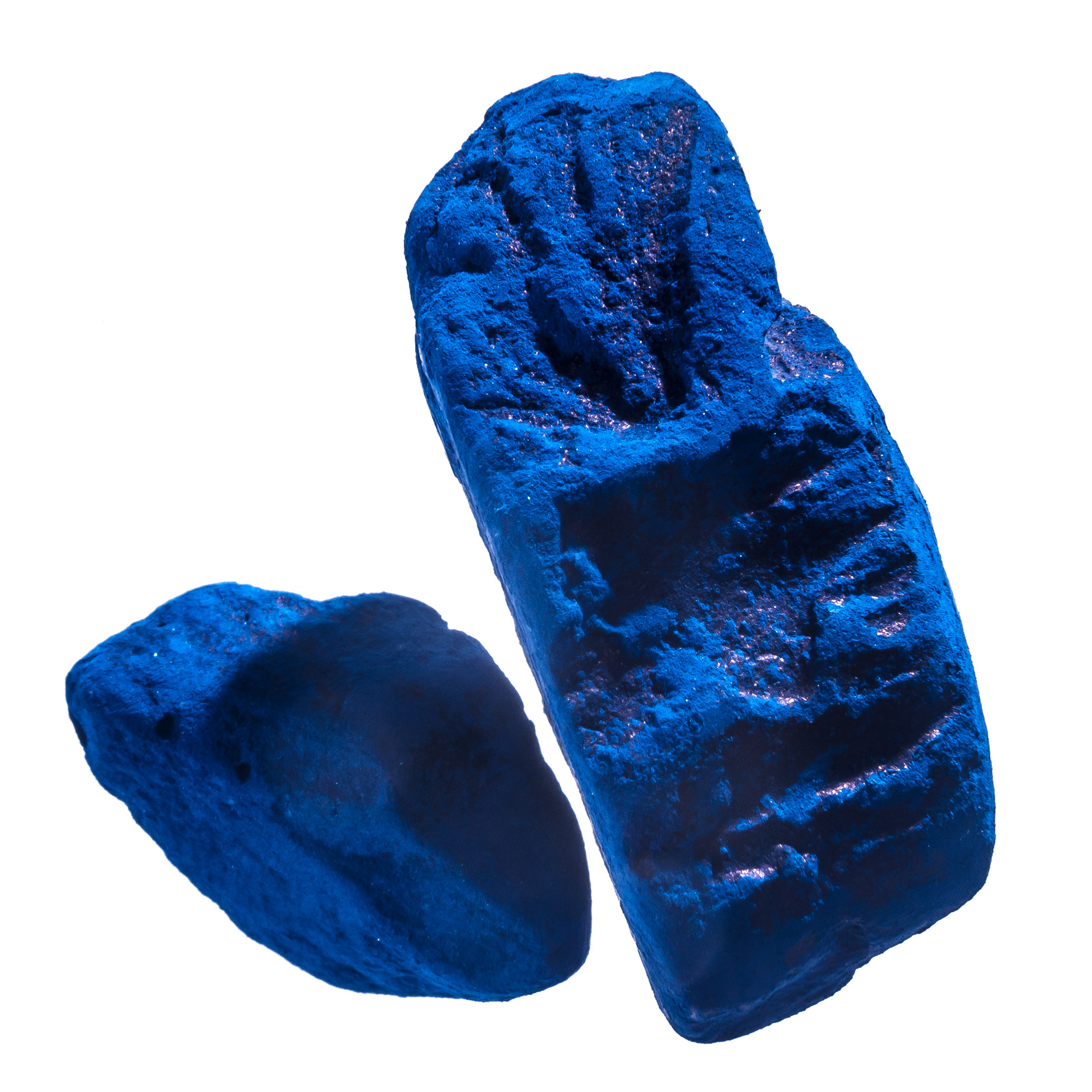
Cake of indigo dye, which is prepared from aniline.

Aniline oil is also used for mushroom identification. Kerrigan's 2016 Agaricus of North America P45: (Referring to Schaffer's reaction) "In fact I recommend switching to the following modified test. Frank (1988) developed an alternative formulation in which aniline oil is combined with glacial acetic acid (GAA, essentially distilled vinegar) in a 50:50 solution. GAA is a much safer, less reactive acid. This single combined reagent is relatively stable over time. A single spot or line applied to the pileus (or other surface). In my experience the newer formulation works as well as Schaffer's while being safer and more convenient."

== History ==
Aniline was first isolated in 1826 by Otto Unverdorben by destructive distillation of indigo. He called it Crystallin. In 1834, Friedlieb Runge isolated a substance from coal tar that turned a beautiful blue color when treated with chloride of lime. He named it kyanol or cyanol. In 1840, Carl Julius Fritzsche (1808–1871) treated indigo with caustic potash and obtained an oil that he named aniline, after an indigo-yielding plant, anil (Indigofera suffruticosa). In 1842, Nikolay Nikolaevich Zinin reduced nitrobenzene and obtained a base that he named benzidam. In 1843, August Wilhelm von Hofmann showed that these were all the same substance, known thereafter as phenylamine or aniline.

=== Synthetic dye industry ===
In 1856, while trying to synthesise quinine, von Hofmann's student William Henry Perkin discovered mauveine. Mauveine quickly became a commercial dye. Other synthetic dyes followed, such as fuchsin, safranin, and induline. At the time of mauveine's discovery, aniline samples were heavily contaminated with toluidines, which complicated the color and reproducibility of the production (also of fushsin). The aniline could be prepared "by the ton" using the Béchamp method. The Béchamp reduction enabled the evolution of a massive dye industry in Germany. Today, the name of BASF, originally Badische Anilin- und Soda-Fabrik (English: Baden Aniline and Soda Factory), now the largest chemical supplier, echoes the legacy of the synthetic dye industry, built via aniline dyes and extended via the related azo dyes. The first azo (N=N) dye was aniline yellow .

=== Developments in medicine ===
In the late 19th century, derivatives of aniline such as acetanilide and phenacetin emerged as analgesic drugs, with their cardiac-suppressive side effects often countered with caffeine. Also in the late 19th century, Paul Ehrlich found that the aniline dye methylene blue works as an antimalarial drug. He hypothesized that dyes that selectively stain pathogens over tissue would prefentially harm pathogens, leading to his "magic bullet" concept.

During the first decade of the 20th century, while trying to modify synthetic dyes to treat African sleeping sickness, Ehrlich – who had coined the term chemotherapy for his 'magic bullet' approach to medicine – failed and switched to modifying Béchamp's atoxyl, the first organic arsenical drug, and serendipitously obtained a treatment for syphilis – salvarsan – the first successful chemotherapy agent. Salvarsan's targeted microorganism, not yet recognized as a bacterium, was still thought to be a parasite, and medical bacteriologists, believing that bacteria were not susceptible to the chemotherapeutic approach, overlooked Alexander Fleming's report in 1928 on the effects of penicillin.

In 1932, Bayer sought medical applications of its dyes. Gerhard Domagk identified as an antibacterial a red azo dye, introduced in 1935 as the first antibacterial drug, prontosil, soon found at Pasteur Institute to be a prodrug degraded in vivo into sulfanilamide – a colorless intermediate for many, highly colorfast azo dyes – already with an expired patent, synthesized in 1908 in Vienna by the researcher Paul Gelmo for his doctoral research. By the 1940s, over 500 related sulfa drugs were produced. Medications in high demand during World War II (1939–45), these first miracle drugs, chemotherapy of wide effectiveness, propelled the American pharmaceutics industry. In 1939, at Oxford University, seeking an alternative to sulfa drugs, Howard Florey developed Fleming's penicillin into the first systemic antibiotic drug, penicillin G. (Gramicidin, developed by René Dubos at Rockefeller Institute in 1939, was the first antibiotic, yet its toxicity restricted it to topical use.) After World War II, Cornelius P. Rhoads introduced the chemotherapeutic approach to cancer treatment.

=== Rocket fuel ===
Some early American rockets, such as the Aerobee and WAC Corporal, used a mixture of aniline and furfuryl alcohol as a fuel, with nitric acid as an oxidizer. The combination is hypergolic, igniting on contact between fuel and oxidizer. It is also dense, and can be stored for extended periods. Aniline was later replaced by hydrazine.

== Toxicology and testing ==
Aniline is toxic by inhalation of the vapour, ingestion, or percutaneous absorption. The IARC lists it in Group 2A (Probably carcinogenic to humans), and it has specifically been linked to bladder cancer. Aniline has been implicated as one possible cause of forest dieback.

Many methods exist for the detection of aniline.

=== Effect on blood oxygen ===
Aniline alters hemoglobin so it cannot carry oxygen (methemoglobinemia), which causes cyanosis (a blue or purple skin color), dizziness, headaches, and shortness of breath. Additionally, Aniline can destroy red blood cells (hemolytic anemia), which can lead to secondary damage in the heart, liver, and kidneys. High exposure can cause confusion, convulsions, irregular heartbeat, coma, and death. Long-term exposure may cause permanent organ damage or increase cancer risks.

=== Oxidative DNA damage ===
Exposure of rats to aniline can elicit a response that is toxic to the spleen, including a tumorigenic response. Rats exposed to aniline in drinking water, showed a significant increase in oxidative DNA damage to the spleen, detected as a 2.8-fold increase in 8-hydroxy-2'-deoxyguanosine (8-OHdG) in their DNA. Although the base excision repair pathway was also activated, its activity was not sufficient to prevent the accumulation of 8-OHdG. The accumulation of oxidative DNA damages in the spleen following exposure to aniline may increase mutagenic events that underlie tumorigenesis.
