= 4-Nitroaniline =

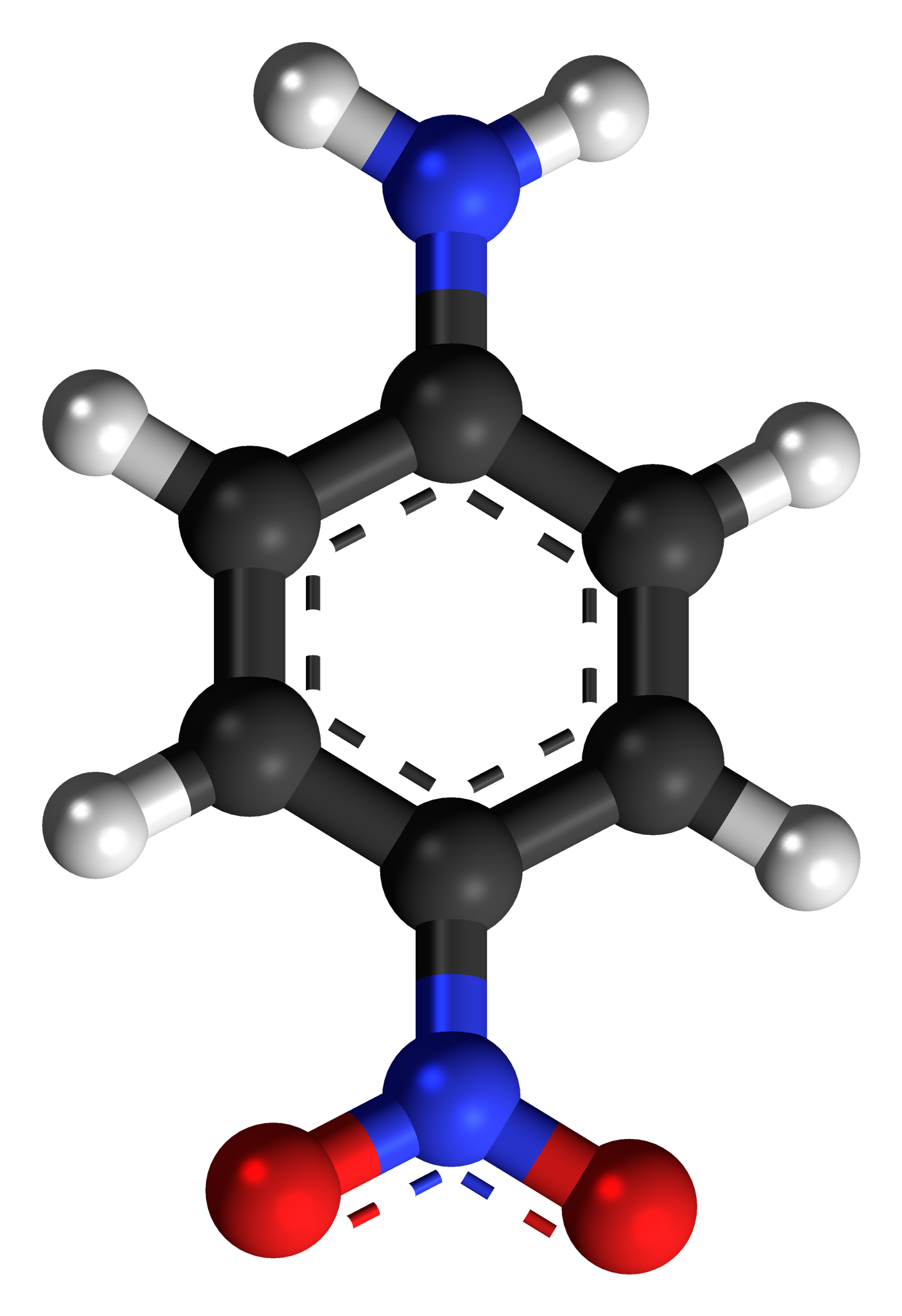

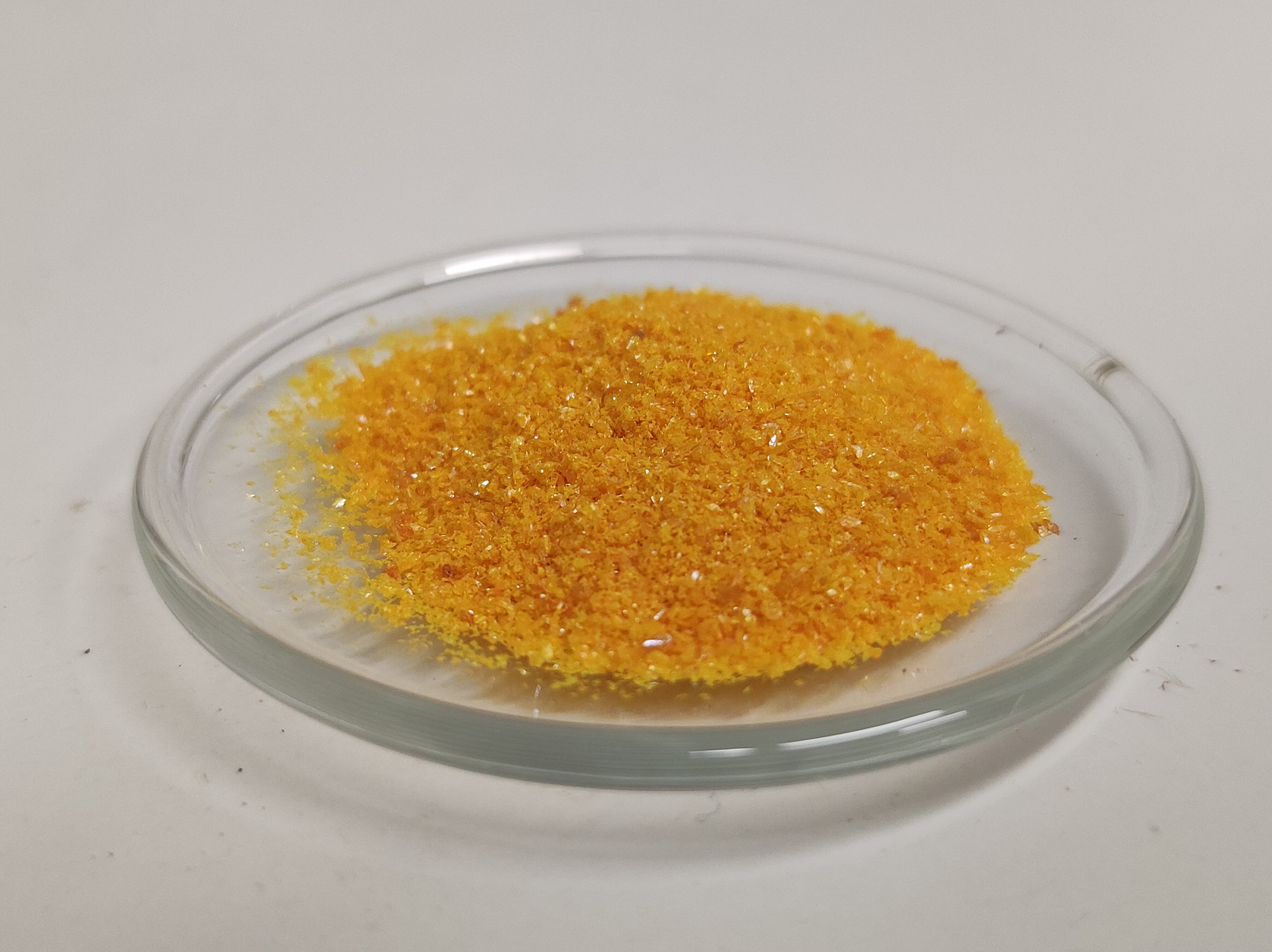

Names
- Preferred IUPAC name 4-Nitroaniline
- Other names p-Nitroaniline; 1-Amino-4-nitrobenzene p-Nitrophenylamine

Identifiers
CAS Number	100-01-6
3D model (JSmol)	Interactive image
Beilstein Reference	508690
ChEBI	CHEBI:17064
ChEMBL	ChEMBL14282
ChemSpider	13846959
ECHA InfoCard	100.002.555
EC Number	202-810-1
Gmelin Reference	27331
KEGG	C02126
PubChem CID	7475
RTECS number	BY7000000
UNII	1MRQ0QZG7G
UN number	1661
CompTox Dashboard (EPA)	DTXSID8020961
- InChI: InChI=1S/C6H6N2O2/c7-5-1-3-6(4-2-5)8(9)10/h1-4H,7H2 Key: TYMLOMAKGOJONV-UHFFFAOYSA-N; InChI=1/C6H6N2O2/c7-5-1-3-6(4-2-5)8(9)10/h1-4H,7H2 Key: TYMLOMAKGOJONV-UHFFFAOYAW
- SMILES: c1cc(ccc1N)N(=O)=O

Properties
Chemical formula	C_{6}H_{6}N_{2}O_{2}
Molar mass	138.12 g/mol
Appearance	yellow or brown powder
Odor	faint, ammonia-like
Density	1.437 g/ml, solid
Melting point	146 to 149 °C (295 to 300 °F; 419 to 422 K) (lit.)
Boiling point	332 °C (630 °F; 605 K)
Solubility in water	0.8 mg/ml at 18.5 °C (IPCS)
Vapor pressure	0.00002 mmHg (20°C)
Magnetic susceptibility (χ)	−66.43·10^{−6} cm^{3}/mol

Hazards
- Occupational safety and health (OHS/OSH)
Main hazards	Toxic
- GHS labelling
Pictograms	(GHS06: Toxic) (GHS08: Health hazard)
Signal word	Warning
Hazard statements	H301, H311, H331, H373, H412
Precautionary statements	P260, P264, P270, P271, P273, P280, P301+P310, P302+P352, P304+P340, P311, P312, P314, P321, P322, P330, P361, P363, P403+P233, P405, P501
NFPA 704 (fire diamond)	2 1 0
Flash point	199 °C (390 °F; 472 K)
- Lethal dose or concentration (LD, LC)
LD_{50} (median dose)	3249 mg/kg (rat, oral); 750 mg/kg (rat, oral); 450 mg/kg (guinea pig, oral); 810 mg/kg (mouse, oral)
- NIOSH (US health exposure limits)
PEL (Permissible)	TWA 6 mg/m3 (1 ppm) [skin]
REL (Recommended)	TWA 3 mg/m^{3} [skin]
IDLH (Immediate danger)	300 mg/m^{3}
Safety data sheet (SDS)	JT Baker

Related compounds
Related compounds	2-Nitroaniline, 3-Nitroaniline
- Except where otherwise noted, data are given for materials in their standard state (at 25 °C [77 °F], 100 kPa). verify (what is ?) Infobox references

4-Nitroaniline, p-nitroaniline or 1-amino-4-nitrobenzene is an organic compound with the formula C_{6}H_{6}N_{2}O_{2}. A yellow solid, it is one of three isomers of nitroaniline. It is an intermediate in the production of dyes, antioxidants, pharmaceuticals, gasoline, gum inhibitors, poultry medicines, and as a corrosion inhibitor.

== Synthesis ==
4-Nitroaniline is produced industrially via the amination of 4-nitrochlorobenzene:

ClC_{6}H_{4}NO_{2} + 2 NH_{3} → H_{2}NC_{6}H_{4}NO_{2} + NH_{4}Cl

Below is a laboratory synthesis of 4-nitroaniline from aniline. The key step in this reaction sequence is an electrophilic aromatic substitution to install the nitro group para to the amino group. The amino group can be easily protonated and become a meta director. Therefore, a protection of the acetyl group is required. After this reaction, a separation must be performed to remove 2-nitroaniline, which is also formed in a small amount during the reaction.

== Applications ==
4-Nitroaniline is mainly consumed industrially as a precursor to p-phenylenediamine, an important dye component. The reduction is effected using iron metal and by catalytic hydrogenation.

It is a starting material for the synthesis of Para Red, the first azo dye:

Synthesis of Para Red

It is also a precursor to 2,6-dichloro-4-nitroaniline, also used in dyes.

=== Laboratory use ===
Nitroaniline undergoes diazotization, which allows access to 1,4-dinitrobenzene and nitrophenylarsonic acid. With phosgene, it converts to 4-nitrophenylisocyanate.

=== Carbon snake demonstration ===
When mixed with sulfuric acid and heated, it dehydrates and polymerizes explosively into a rigid foam. The exact composition of the foam is unclear, but the process is believed to involve acidic protonation as well as displacement of the amine group by a sulfonic acid moiety.

In Carbon snake demo, paranitroaniline can be used instead of sugar, if the experiment is allowed to proceed under an obligatory fumehood. With this method the reaction phase prior to the black snake's appearance is longer, but once complete, the black snake itself rises from the container very rapidly. This reaction may cause an explosion if too much sulfuric acid is used.

== Toxicity ==
The compound is toxic by way of inhalation, ingestion, and absorption, and should be handled with care. Its LD_{50} in rats is 750.0 mg/kg when administered orally. 4-Nitroaniline is particularly harmful to all aquatic organisms, and can cause long-term damage to the environment if released as a pollutant.

== See also ==
- 2-Nitroaniline
- 3-Nitroaniline
